= List of electrical phenomena =

Phenomena involving electrical occurrences

This is a list of electrical phenomena. Electrical phenomena are a somewhat arbitrary division of electromagnetic phenomena.

Some examples are:

- Atmospheric electricity
- Biefeld–Brown effect — Thought by the person who coined the name, Thomas Townsend Brown, to be an anti-gravity effect, it is generally attributed to electrohydrodynamics (EHD) or sometimes electro-fluid-dynamics, a counterpart to the well-known magneto-hydrodynamics.
- Bioelectrogenesis — The generation of electricity by living organisms.
- Capacitive coupling — Transfer of energy within an electrical network or between distant networks by means of displacement current.
- Contact electrification — The phenomenon of electrification by contact. When two objects were touched together, sometimes the objects became spontaneously charged (οne negative charge, one positive charge).
- Corona effect — Build-up of charges in a high-voltage conductor (common in AC transmission lines), which ionizes the air and produces visible light, usually purple.
- Dielectric polarization — Orientation of charges in certain insulators inside an external static electric field, such as when a charged object is brought close, which produces an electric field inside the insulator.
- Direct Current — (old: Galvanic Current) or "continuous current"; The continuous flow of electricity through a conductor such as a wire from high to low potential.
- Electromagnetic induction — Production of a voltage by a time-varying magnetic flux.
- Electroluminescence — The phenomenon wherein a material emits light in response to an electric current passed through it, or to a strong electric field.
- Electrostatic induction — Redistribution of charges in a conductor inside an external static electric field, such as when a charged object is brought close.
- Electrical conduction — The movement of electrically charged particles through transmission medium.
- Electric shock — Physiological reaction of a biological organism to the passage of electric current through its body.
- Ferranti effect — A rise in the amplitude of the AC voltage at the receiving end of a transmission line, compared with the sending-end voltage, due to the capacitance between the conductors, when the receiving end is open-circuited.
- Ferroelectric effect — The phenomenon whereby certain ionic crystals may exhibit a spontaneous dipole moment.
- Hall effect — Separation of charges in a current-carrying conductor inside an external magnetic field, which produces a voltage across the conductor.
- Inductance — The phenomenon whereby the property of a circuit by which energy is stored in the form of an electromagnetic field.
- Induction heating — Heat produced in a conductor when eddy currents pass through it.
- Joule heating — Heat produced in a conductor when charges move through it, such as in resistors and wires.
- Lightning — powerful natural electrostatic discharge produced during a thunderstorm. Lightning's abrupt electric discharge is accompanied by the emission of light.
- Noise and electromagnetic interference — Unwanted and usually random disturbance in an electrical signal. A Faraday cage can be used to attenuate electromagnetic fields, even to avoid the discharge from a Tesla coil.
- Photoconductivity — The phenomenon in which a material becomes more conductive due to the absorption of electro-magnetic radiation such as visible light, ultraviolet light, or gamma radiation.
- Photoelectric effect — Emission of electrons from a surface (usually metallic) upon exposure to, and absorption of, electromagnetic radiation (such as visible light and ultraviolet radiation).
- Photovoltaic effect — Production of a voltage by light exposure.
- Piezoelectric effect — Ability of certain crystals to generate a voltage in response to applied mechanical stress.
- Plasma — Plasma occur when gas is heated to very high temperatures and it disassociates into positive and negative charges.
- Proximity effect — Redistribution of charge flow in a conductor carrying alternating current when there are other nearby current-carrying conductors.
- Pyroelectric effect — The potential created in certain materials when they are heated.
- Redox — (short for reduction-oxidation reaction) A chemical reaction in which the oxidation states of atoms are changed.
- Skin effect — Tendency of charges to distribute at the surface of a conductor, when an alternating current passes through it.
- Static electricity — Class of phenomena involving the imbalanced charge present on an object, typically referring to charge with voltages of sufficient magnitude to produce visible attraction (e.g., static cling), repulsion, and sparks.
- Sparks — Electrical breakdown of a medium that produces an ongoing plasma discharge, similar to the instant spark, resulting from a current flowing through normally nonconductive media such as air.
- Telluric currents — Extremely low frequency electric current that occurs naturally over large underground areas at or near the surface of the Earth.
- Thermionic emission — the emission of electrons from a heated electrode, usually the cathode, the principle underlying most vacuum tubes.
- Thermoelectric effect — the Seebeck effect, the Peltier effect, and the Thomson effect.
- Thunderstorm — also electrical storm, form of weather characterized by the presence of lightning and its acoustic effect on the Earth's atmosphere known as thunder.
- Triboelectric effect — Type of contact electrification in which objects become electrically charged after coming into contact and are then separated. A Van de Graaff generator is based on this principle.
- Whistlers — Very low frequency radio wave generated by lightning.
