= Paul Alfred Biefeld =

American astronomer (1867–1943)

Dr. Paul Alfred Biefeld German: [ˈpaʊl ˈalfʁɛd ˈbiːfɛld] (22 March 1867 – 21 June 1943) was a German-American electrical engineer, astronomer and teacher.

== Biography ==
Paul Alfred Biefeld was born in Jöhstadt, Kingdom of Saxony on March 22, 1867. He was the son of Heinrich and Wilhelmina (Glaeser) Biefeld, he moved to the United States in 1881. Biefeld received his B.S. in electrical engineering at the University of Wisconsin–Madison in 1894. He received his Ph.D. at the University of Zurich, Switzerland in 1900.

He married Emma Bausch, of Frankfurt am Main, on 11 April 1900. He was the Assistant Principal of the high school in Appleton, Wisconsin 1894–1897. Paul was the laboratory assistant in Physics and Electrical Engineering at the ETH Zürich, 1899–1900. Biefeld was the professor of Physics and Electrical Engineering at the Hildburghausen Technikum, Germany, from 1900 to 1906. He was also the professor of Physics and Astronomy at the University of Akron, Akron, Ohio in 1906 and continued until 1911. He arrived at Denison University in 1911, where he was the professor and lecturer of astronomy and the director of the Warner and Swasey Observatory. He continued to teach at Denison University and lived in Granville, Ohio until his death in June 1943.

Biefeld joined the Yerkes Eclipse Expedition to Denver, Colorado in 1918. He was the research assistant at Yerkes Observatory for the summer of 1919. Biefeld was part of the Yerkes Eclipse Expedition to Santa Catalina Island in September 1923.

== In popular culture ==
=== Biefeld–Brown effect ===
In popular culture Biefeld's name has come to be associated with the Biefeld–Brown effect, an electrical effect where extremely high voltages can produce a type of propulsion, usually attributed an ion wind, but also associated with several anti-gravity theories. The effect was named by inventor Thomas Townsend Brown, a former student of Biefeld at Denison University in Ohio. Brown claimed Biefeld as his mentor and co-experimenter, although he seems to have named this effect many years after his association with Biefeld. Brown only attended Denison University for one year and their records show no evidence of any research or experiments being carried out by Biefeld/Brown during Biefeld's professorship there.

Brown seemed to think the effect demonstrated a connection between electricity and gravity, which he thought was being negated by the high voltage.

=== Association with Albert Einstein ===
Publications promoting the Biefeld–Brown effect/electrogravitics/anti-gravity tend to emphasize Paul Biefeld's standing as a physicist via titling him a "colleague of Albert Einstein", based on the fact that Biefeld and Einstein attended ETH Zürich at the same time. Later in life Biefeld recounted that Einstein borrowed his class notes, but there is little evidence of anything more than a passing acquaintance between the two students.

== Affiliations ==
- Member of the American Astronomical Society
- Member of the Astronomical Society of the Pacific
- Republican Party
- Baptists
