= Optoelectrofluidics =

Study of particle motion in electric fields

Optoelectrofluidics, also known as optically induced electrohydrodynamics, refers to the study of the motions of particles or molecules and their interactions with optically-induced electric field and the surrounding fluid.

This concept includes electrothermal vortex, electrophoresis, dielectrophoresis, and electroosmosis induced by combination of optical and electrical energy or by optical-electrical energy transfer.

In 1995, an electrothermal vortices induced by a strong IR (infrared) laser projected into an electric field have been utilized to concentrate microparticles and molecules. In 2000, UV(ultraviolet) pattern projected onto ITO (indium tin oxide) electrode has been applied for patterning colloidal particles. Illumination of the ITO electrode by UV light results in a small increase in the current from the generation of electron-hole pairs at the ITO/water interface. In 2005, optoelectronic tweezers (OET), wherein a photoconductive material was utilized to induce electric field using the optical decrement of electrical resistance on a partially illuminated area, has been reported. After that, many researches in several view-points have been performed as below.

== Display Devices ==
1. DMD(digital micromirror device)-based Optoelectronic Tweezers (OET) : P.Y. Chiou, et al., Nature 436, pp. 370-372 (2005)
2. Projector-based Image Dielectrophoresis (iDEP) : Y.-s. Lu, et al., Opt. Quant. Elec. 37, pp. 1385-1395 (2006)
3. LCD(liquid crystal display)-based Lab-on-a-Display (LOD) : W. Choi, et al., Microfluid. Nanofluid. 3, pp. 217-225 (2007)
4. Lens-integrated LCD-based System : H. Hwang, et al., Electrophoresis 29, pp. 1203-1212 (2008)

== System Configuration ==
1. Interactive & Microscope-integrated System : H. Hwang, et al., Electrophoresis 29, pp. 1203-1212 (2008)
2. Double Photoconductive Layers : H. Hwang, et al., Appl. Phys. Lett. 92, pp. 024108 (2008)
3. Floating Electrode OET : S. Park, et al., Appl. Phys. Lett. 92, pp. 151101 (2008)
4. Integration with Electrowetting Device : G.J. Shah, et al., Lab Chip doi:10.1039/b821508a (2009)
5. Optoelectrofluidic Fluorescence Microscopy: H. Hwang and J.-K. Park, Anal. Chem. doi:10.1021/ac901047v (2009)

== Target Materials ==
1. Cultured cells : A.T. Ohta, et al., IEEE J. Sel. Top. Quant. Elec. 13, pp. 237-240 (2007)
2. DNA : M. Hoeb, et al., Biophys. J. 93, pp. 1032-1038 (2007)
3. Blood cell : H. Hwang, et al., Electrophoresis 29, pp. 1203-1212 (2008)
4. Semiconducting nanowires : A. Jamshidi, et al., Nat. Photon. 2, pp. 86-89 (2008)
5. Swimming bacteria : W. Choi, et al., Appl. Phys. Lett. 93, pp. 143901 (2008)
6. Oocyte : H. Hwang, et al., Biomicrofluidics 3, pp. 014103 (2009)
7. Polysaccharide, Protein and Fluorophore : H. Hwang and J.-K. Park, Anal. Chem. doi:10.1021/ac901047v (2009)

== Operating Principles ==
1. Dielectrophoresis (DEP) : Most of the researches above.
2. AC Electro-osmosis (ACEO) : P.-Y. Chiou, et al., J. Microelectromech. Syst. 17, pp. 525-531 (2008)
3. Electro-orientation :W. Choi, et al., Appl. Phys. Lett. 93, pp. 143901 (2008)
4. Electrothermal flow : A. Mizuno, et al., IEEE Trans. Ind. Appl. 31, pp. 464-468 (1995), S.J. Williams, A. Kumar and S. T. Wereley, Lab Chip 8, pp. 1879-1882 (2008)
5. Combination of AC Electrokinetics : H. Hwang and J.-K. Park, Lab Chip 9, pp. 199-206 (2009), H. Hwang and J.-K. Park, Anal. Chem. doi:10.1021/ac901047v (2009)

6. Optically induced electrohydrodynamic instability (OEHI): Feifei Wang, Haibo Yu, Wenfeng Liang, Lianqing Liu, John D. Mai, Gwo-Bin Lee, Wen Jung Li, Microfluidics and Nanofluidics, Volume 16, Issue 6, pp. 1097–1106

== Other Phenomena ==
1. Surface-Particle Interactions : H. Hwang, et al., Appl. Phys. Lett. 92, pp. 024108 (2008)
2. Particle-Particle Interactions : H. Hwang, et al., J. Phys. Chem. B 32, pp. 9903–9908 (2008) doi:10.1021/jp803596r

== Applications ==
1. Microlens Array Fabrication : J.-Y. Huang, Y.-S. Lu and J. A. Teh, Opt. Express 14, pp. 10779-10784 (2006)
2. Microparticle Separation : H. Hwang and J.-K. Park, Lab Chip 9, pp. 199-206 (2009)
3. In vitro Fertilization : H. Hwang, et al., Biomicrofluidics 3, pp. 014103 (2009)
4. Electroporation : J.K. Valley, et al., Lab Chip doi:10.1039/b821678a (2009)
5. Local Chemical Concentration Control : H. Hwang and J.-K. Park, Anal. Chem. doi:10.1021/ac901047v (2009)
6. Colloidal Assembly : H. Hwang, Y.-H. Park and J.-K. Park, Langmuir 25, pp. 6010-6014 (2009)

== Research Groups ==
1. Ming C. Wu's Group : Integrated Photonics Laboratory, UC Berkeley, CA, USA
2. Je-Kyun Park's Group : NanoBiotech Laboratory, KAIST, KOREA
3. P.Y. Chiou's Group : Optoelectronic Biofluidics Laboratory, UCLA, CA, USA
4. Steve Wereley's Group : Microfluidics Laboratory, Purdue University, IN, USA
5. Aloke Kumar's Group : Kumar Biomicrofluidics Laboratory
6. Stuart William's Group :
7. Han-Sheng Chuang's Group :
