= Frank William Peek =

American electrical engineer

Frank William Peek Jr. (August 20, 1881, Mokelumne Hill, California – July 27, 1933, near Gaspé, Quebec) was an American electrical engineer and inventor, known as a pioneer in engineering research on the creation of extremely high voltage electricity. He is often given the sobriquet "inventor of man-made lightning". He is known for Peek's law.

== Biography ==
Peek graduated in 1905 with a bachelor's degree from Stanford University and in 1911 with a master's degree in electrical engineering from Schenectady's Union College. He then became a consulting and research engineer for General Electric (GE) in Pittsfield, Massachusetts.

In June 1931 Harris J. Ryan and Herbert Hoover offered Peek the chair of the Engineering College of Stanford University, but he rejected the offer in favor of "the top engineering job at GE".

Peek patented inventions related to electrical transmission, insulation, and protective devices. He did fundamental research on laws of corona discharge, as well as transient phenomena and electrical transmission. He was elected in 1922 a fellow of the American Physical Society. He was awarded in 1923 the Thomas Fitch Rowland Prize of the American Society of Civil Engineers and in 1926 the Louis E. Levy Medal of the Franklin Institute.

On August 9, 1913, in Oswego, New York, he married Merle A. Bell, who was a graduate of Syracuse University. In 1933, Frank and Merle Peek were on a trip to Canada when their automobile was struck by a locomotive at a grade-crossing — he was killed and she was injured.

== Selected publications ==
=== Articles ===
- Peek, F. W. (1911). "The law of corona and the dielectric strength of air". Proceedings of the American Institute of Electrical Engineers. 30 (7): 1485–1561. doi:10.1109/PAIEE.1911.6659605. S2CID 51640231.
- —— (1912). "The law of corona and dielectric strength of air — II". Proceedings of the American Institute of Electrical Engineers. 31 (6): 1085–1126. doi:10.1109/PAIEE.1912.6659840. S2CID 51654500.
- —— (1913). "High-voltage engineering". Journal of the Franklin Institute. 176 (6): 611–643. doi:10.1016/S0016-0032(13)90044-2.
- —— (1913). "Law of corona and dielectric strength of air — III". Proceedings of the American Institute of Electrical Engineers. 32 (6): 1335–1355. doi:10.1109/PAIEE.1913.6660748. S2CID 51674161.
- —— (1914). "The Sphere Gap as a Means of Measuring High Voltage". Transactions of the American Institute of Electrical Engineers: 923–949. doi:10.1109/T-AIEE.1914.4765166. S2CID 51642770.
- —— (1914). "Effect of Altitude on the Spark-Over Voltages of Bushings, Leads and Insulators". Transactions of the American Institute of Electrical Engineers (2): 1721–1730. doi:10.1109/T-AIEE.1914.4765197. S2CID 51638615.
- —— (1915). "The Effect of Transient Voltages on Dielectrics". Transactions of the American Institute of Electrical Engineers (2): 1857–1920. doi:10.1109/T-AIEE.1915.4765281. S2CID 51653488.
- —— (1923). "Make-Believe Lightning". Scientific American. 129 (4): 254. Bibcode:1923SciAm.129..254P. doi:10.1038/scientificamerican1023-254.
- —— (1924). "Lightning and Other Transients on Transmission Lines". Transactions of the American Institute of Electrical Engineers: 1205–1221. doi:10.1109/T-AIEE.1924.5061070. S2CID 51667277.
- —— (1924). "High-voltage phenomena". Journal of the Franklin Institute. 197: 1–44. doi:10.1016/S0016-0032(24)90489-3.
- —— (1925). "Lightning". Journal of the Franklin Institute. 199 (2): 141–182. doi:10.1016/S0016-0032(25)91042-3.
- —— (1926). "Lightning a Study of Lightning Rods and Cages, with Special Reference to the Protection of Oil Tanks". Transactions of the American Institute of Electrical Engineers: 1131–1146. doi:10.1109/T-AIEE.1926.5061309. S2CID 51633908.
- —— (1927). "The Law of Corona and the Dielectric Strength of Air — IV the Mechanism of Corona Formation and Loss". Transactions of the American Institute of Electrical Engineers: 1009–1024. doi:10.1109/T-AIEE.1927.5061442. S2CID 51676057.

=== Books ===
- Peek, Frank William (1920). Dielectric Phenomena in High Voltage Engineering (2nd ed.). McGraw-Hill. (1st edition, 1915)
