= SDW =

SDW may refer to:

- Sandwich railway station, station code
- Seven dirty words
- South Downs Way
- Spin density wave
- Static discharge wick, a device attached to the trailing edge of an aircraft's wing to deflect lightning
- .sdw is a file extension used by StarOffice Writer
- SDW (TV station), a digital television station in Western Australia, part of the West Digital Television network
- Six-Day War
