= Trailing edge =

Rear edge of an aerodynamic surface

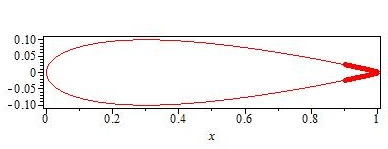
Cross section of an aerodynamic surface with the trailing edge emphasised

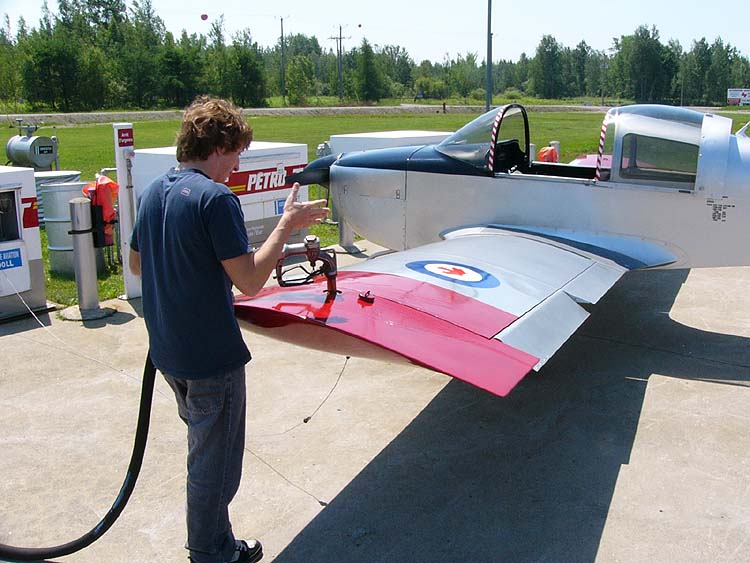
An American Aviation AA-1 Yankee being refuelled. Its wing trailing edge can be seen with aileron (deployed downwards) and flap.

The trailing edge of an aerodynamic surface such as a wing is its rear edge, where the airflow separated by the leading edge meets. Essential flight control surfaces are attached here to control the direction of the departing air flow, and exert a controlling force on the aircraft. Such control surfaces include ailerons on the wings for roll control, elevators on the tailplane controlling pitch, and the rudder on the fin controlling yaw. Elevators and ailerons may be combined as elevons on tailless aircraft.

The shape of the trailing edge is of prime importance in the aerodynamic function of any aerodynamic surface. A sharp trailing edge is always employed in an airfoil. George Batchelor has written about:

“ ... the remarkable controlling influence exerted by the sharp trailing edge of an aerofoil on the circulation.”

== Extensions ==
Other sharp-edged surfaces that are attached to the trailing edges of wings or control surfaces include:

- On control surfaces:

- trim tabs
- servo tabs
- anti-servo tabs

- Other surfaces:

- flaps

Other equipment that may be attached to the trailing edges of wings include:

- anti-shock bodies
- static wicks

== Trailing edge shape ==
The trailing edge is where the upper and lower surfaces of a wing meet. The angle between the upper and lower surfaces at the trailing edge is called the trailing edge angle. If the trailing edge angle is zero it is described as a cusped trailing edge.

In two-dimensional flow around a uniform wing of infinite span, the slope of the lift curve is determined primarily by the trailing edge angle. The slope is greatest if the angle is zero; and decreases as the angle increases. For a wing of finite span, the aspect ratio of the wing also significantly influences the slope of the curve. As aspect ratio decreases, the slope also decreases.
