= Anti universe =

Anti universe may refer to:

- Antimatter, matter composed of the antiparticles
- Multiverse, the hypothetical set of all universes
- Anti-gravity, a hypothetical phenomenon of creating a place or object that is free from the force of gravity
