= Ion-propelled aircraft =

Electrohydrodynamic aircraft propulsion

An ion-propelled aircraft or ionocraft is an aircraft that uses electrohydrodynamics (EHD) to provide lift or thrust in the air without requiring combustion or moving parts. Current designs do not produce sufficient thrust for crewed flight or useful loads.

== History ==
=== Origins ===
The principle of ionic wind propulsion with corona-generated charged particles was discovered soon after the discovery of electricity with references dating to 1709 in a book titled Physico-Mechanical Experiments on Various Subjects by Francis Hauksbee.

=== VTOL "lifter" experiments ===
American experimenter Thomas Townsend Brown spent much of his life working on the principle, under the mistaken impression that it was an anti-gravity effect, which he named the Biefeld–Brown effect. Since his devices produced thrust in the direction of the field gradient, regardless of the direction of gravity, and did not work in a vacuum, other workers realized that the effect was due to electrohydrodynamics.

Vertical take-off and landing (VTOL) ion-propelled aircraft are sometimes called "lifters". Early examples were able to lift about a gram of weight per watt. This was insufficient to lift the heavy high-voltage power supply necessary, which remained on the ground and supplied the craft via long, thin and flexible wires.

The use of electrohydrodynamics propulsion for lift was studied by American aircraft designer Major Alexander Prokofieff de Seversky in the 1950s and 1960s. He filed a patent for an "ionocraft" in 1959. He built and flew a model VTOL ionocraft capable of sideways maneuvering by varying the voltages applied in different areas, although the heavy power supply remained external.

The 2008 Wingless Electromagnetic Air Vehicle (WEAV), a saucer-shaped EHD lifter with electrodes embedded throughout its surface, was studied by a team of researchers led by Subrata Roy at the University of Florida in the early part of the twenty-first century. The propulsion system employed many innovations, including the use of magnetic fields to enhance the ionisation efficiency. A model with an external supply achieved minimal lift-off and hover.

=== Onboard power ===
Twenty-first century power supplies are lighter and more efficient. The first ion-propelled aircraft to take off and fly using its own onboard power supply was a VTOL craft developed by Ethan Krauss of Electron Air in 2006. His first patent application was filed in 2014, and he was awarded a microgrant to support his project by Stardust Startups in 2017. The company currently owns US patent US 10119527B2 and US 11161631B2 in relation to this field. The craft developed enough thrust to rise rapidly or to fly horizontally for several minutes.

In November 2018 the first self-contained ion-propelled fixed-wing airplane, the MIT EAD Airframe Version 2 flew 60 meters. It was developed by a team of students led by Steven Barrett from the Massachusetts Institute of Technology. It had a 5-meter wingspan and weighed 2.45 kg. The craft was catapult-launched using an elastic band, with the EAD system sustaining the aircraft in flight at low level.

== Principles of operation ==
Ionic air propulsion is a technique for creating a flow of air through electrical energy, without any moving parts. Because of this it is sometimes described as a "solid-state" drive. It is based on the principle of electrohydrodynamics.

In its basic form, it consists of two parallel conductive electrodes, a leading emitter wire and a downstream collector. When such an arrangement is powered by high voltage (in the range of kilovolts per mm), the emitter ionizes molecules in the air that accelerate backwards to the collector, producing thrust in reaction. Along the way, these ions collide with electrically neutral air molecules and accelerate them in turn.

The effect is not directly dependent on electrical polarity, as the ions may be positively or negatively charged. Reversing the polarity of the electrodes does not alter the direction of motion, as it also reverses the polarity of the ions carrying charge. Thrust is produced in the same direction, either way. For positive corona, nitrogen ions are created initially, while for negative polarity, oxygen ions are the major primary ions. Both these types of ion immediately attract a variety of air molecules to create molecular cluster-ions of either sign, which act as charge carriers.

Current EHD thrusters are far less efficient than conventional engines. An MIT researcher noted that ion thrusters have the potential to be far more efficient than conventional jet engines.

Unlike pure ion thruster rockets, the electrohydrodynamic principle does not apply in the vacuum of space.

=== Electrohydrodynamics ===
The thrust generated by an EHD device is an example of the Biefeld–Brown effect and can be derived through a modified use of the Child–Langmuir equation. A generalized one-dimensional treatment gives the equation:
$$F = \frac{Id}{k}$$
where

- F is the resulting force.
- I is the electric current.
- d is the air gap.
- k is the ion mobility of the working fluid, expressed in A⋅s^{2}⋅kg^{−1} in SI units, but more commonly expressed with the unit m^{2}⋅V^{−1}⋅s^{−1}. A typical value for air at surface pressure and temperature is 1.5×10^{−4} m^{2}⋅V^{−1}⋅s^{−1}).

As applied to a gas such as air, the principle is also referred to as electroaerodynamics (EAD).

When the ionocraft is turned on, the corona wire becomes charged with high voltage, usually between 20 and 50 kV. When the corona wire reaches approximately 30 kV, it causes the air molecules nearby to become ionised by stripping their electrons from them. As this happens, the ions are repelled from the anode and attracted towards the collector, causing the majority of the ions to accelerate toward the collector. These ions travel at a constant average velocity termed the drift velocity. Such velocity depends on the mean free path between collisions, the strength of the external electric field, and the mass of ions and neutral air molecules.

The fact that the current is carried by a corona discharge (and not a tightly confined arc) means that the moving particles diffuse into an expanding ion cloud, and collide frequently with neutral air molecules. It is these collisions that impart momentum to the neutral air molecules, which, because they are neutral, do not migrate back to the second electrode. Instead they continue to travel in the same direction, creating a neutral wind. As these neutral molecules are ejected from the ionocraft, there are, in agreement with Newton's third law of motion, equal and opposite forces, so the ionocraft moves in the opposite direction with an equal force. The force exerted is comparable to a gentle breeze. The resulting thrust depends on other external factors including air pressure and temperature, gas composition, voltage, humidity, and air gap distance.

The air mass in the gap between the electrodes is impacted repeatedly by excited particles moving at high drift velocity. This creates electrical resistance, which must be overcome. The result of the neutral air caught in the process is to effectively cause an exchange in momentum and thus generate thrust. The heavier and denser the air, the higher the resulting thrust.

=== Aircraft configuration ===
As with conventional reaction thrust, EAD thrust may be directed either horizontally to power a fixed-wing airplane or vertically to support a powered lift craft, sometimes referred to as a "lifter".

== Design ==
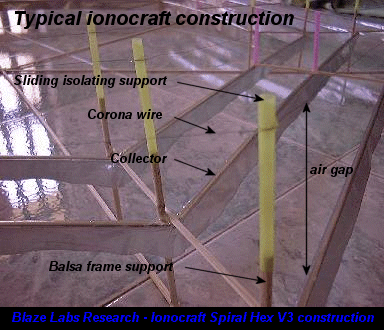
Typical ionocraft construction

The thrust generating components of an ion propulsion system consist of three parts; a corona or emitter wire, an air gap and a collector wire or strip downstream from the emitter. A lightweight insulating frame supports the arrangement. The emitter and collector should be as close to each other as possible, i.e. with a narrow air gap, to achieve a saturated corona current condition that produces maximum thrust. However, if the emitter is too close to the collector it tends to arc across the gap.

Ion propulsion systems require many safety precautions due to the required high voltage.

=== Emitter ===
The emitter wire is typically connected to the positive terminal of the high voltage power supply. In general, it is made from a small gauge bare conductive wire. While copper wire can be used, it does not work as well as stainless steel. Similarly, thinner wire such as 44 or 50 gauge tends to outperform more common, larger sizes such as 30 gauge, as the stronger electric field around the smaller diameter wire results in lower ionisation onset voltage and a larger corona current as described by Peek's law.

The emitter is sometimes referred to as the "corona wire" because of its tendency to emit a purple corona discharge glow while in use. This is simply a side effect of ionization.

=== Air gap ===
The air gap insulates the two electrodes and allows the ions generated at the emitter to accelerate and transfer momentum to neutral air molecules, before losing their charge at the collector. The width of the air gap is typically 1 mm / kV.

=== Collector ===
The collector is shaped to provide a smooth equipotential surface underneath the corona wire. Variations of this include a wire mesh, parallel conductive tubes, or a foil skirt with a smooth, round edge. Sharp edges on the skirt degrade performance, as it generates ions of opposite polarity to those within the thrust mechanism.

== See also ==
- Atmosphere-breathing electric propulsion – Spacecraft propulsion technology
- Biefeld–Brown effect – Force observed on an asymmetric capacitor
- Hall-effect thruster – Type of electric propulsion system
- Ion thruster – Form of electric spacecraft propulsion
- Ion wind – Charged-particle flow due to high electrostatic potential
- Magnetoplasmadynamic thruster – Form of electrically powered spacecraft propulsion
- Plasma actuator – Type of actuator
