= MIT EAD Airframe Version 2 =

Ionocraft

EAD Airframe Version 2

General information
- Other name: V2
- Type: First ion wind airplane
- National origin: United States
- Manufacturer: Massachusetts Institute of Technology
- Designer: Steven Barrett et al.
- Owners: MIT
- Number built: 1
- Flights: 11

History
- Manufactured: 2018
- First flight: 2018
- Last flight: 2018
- Developed from: EAD Airframe Version 1

The EAD Airframe Version 2, or V2, is a small American unmanned aircraft. It has been described as 'solid state', as there are no moving parts in the propulsion system; all thrust is powered by the phenomenon known as ion wind. As of 2018 it was being developed at the MIT Department of Aeronautics and Astronautics by associate professor Steven Barrett and others.

It is claimed to be the first ion-propelled airplane. Tethered ion-propelled aircraft without wings have existed since the 1960s. These had ground-based high-voltage power supplied to the aircraft via wire.

== Design and development ==
The aircraft is a flying wing made of very light materials, including carbon-fiber, shrink-wrap plastic, balsa wood, polystyrene, and Kevlar. It has a very wide open frame serving as a fuselage, in and below which thin wires are strung horizontally. The aircraft weighs just over 2.5 kilograms (6 lb) and has a wingspan of 5 metres (16 ft 4.9 in).

The MIT engineers were able fine tune the aircraft to find the best design and power requirement by employing a technique known as geometric programming.

It can fly at around 4.8 metres per second (16 ft/s; 17 km/h; 11 mph).

=== Propulsion ===
The aircraft is an example of an ionocraft, which is powered by an ionic wind generated through controlled electrical discharge. (EAD stands for electroerodynamic.)

The fuselage contains a stack of 54 lithium-polymer batteries. With the aid of a power supply unit these deliver a minimum of 20,000 volts of electrical potential, producing enough corona discharge (EMF) to propel the aircraft. Air at the front of the wing is ionized by an electrical field near thin filaments of wire called emitters. Elsewhere on the airframe, collectors attract these positively charged ions. As the ions travel toward the collectors, they collide with air molecules. Energy is transferred from the ions to the air molecules, thereby producing air flow; the thrust propels the aircraft forwards, fast enough to gain flying speed, with the conventional wings providing aerodynamic lift.

== Operational history ==
The aircraft has flown at least eleven times, in the duPont Athletic Center, an indoor gymnasium on the MIT campus. The flight distances have been constrained by the 60-metre (197 ft) long space within the gymnasium, and the aircraft normally flies about 2 metres (6 ft 7 in) off the ground.
