= Thomas Townsend Brown =

American inventor (1905–1985)

Thomas Townsend Brown (March 18, 1905 – October 27, 1985) was an American inventor whose experiments and research on electricity based anti-gravitational observable momentum by ionizing different materials led him to believe he discovered a type of anti-gravity. He believed this was caused by strong electric fields. Instead of anti-gravity, what Brown observed has generally been attributed to electrohydrodynamics, the movement of charged particles that transfer their momentum to surrounding neutral particles in the air, also called "ionic drift" or "ionic wind". For most of Brown's life, he developed devices based on his ideas, promoting them for use by industry and the military. The phenomena came to be called the "Biefeld–Brown effect" and "electrogravitics". He was granted multiple patents.

Brown's research influenced some amateur experimenters who build "ionic propulsion lifters" powered by high voltage. There are still claims that Brown discovered anti-gravity, an idea popular with the unidentified flying object (UFO) community and spawning numerous conspiracy theories.

== Biography ==
Thomas Townsend Brown was born into a wealthy construction family in Zanesville, Ohio in 1905. His parents were Lewis K. and Mary Townsend Brown. Thomas was interested in electronics from early childhood. His wealthy parents indulged their son's interests, buying him experimental equipment. Brown started a lifelong series of experiments with electrical phenomena and began investigating what he thought was an electro-gravity phenomenon while still in high school.

For two years, in 1922 and 1923, Brown attended Doane Academy, a preparatory school associated with Granville, Ohio's Denison University, graduating in June 1923. In the fall of 1923, he entered the California Institute of Technology. Brown struggled with the required curriculum of a first-year student, and to help Thomas in his school work, his parents set up a fully provisioned private laboratory in the family home in Pasadena, California. He demonstrated his ideas on electricity and gravity to guests such as the physicist and Nobel laureate Robert A. Millikan. Millikan told the first-year student his ideas were impossible and advised him to complete his college education before trying to develop such theories. Brown left Caltech after his first year. In 1924, he attended Denison University but left there after a year.

In September 1928, Brown married Josephine Beale, daughter of the Zanesville, Ohio, resident Clifford Beale.

In 1930, Brown enlisted in the United States Navy as an apprentice seaman. After completing basic training, based on his background in experimental electrical research, he was ordered to report to duty at the United States Naval Research Laboratory on March 16, 1931. He performed the dual roles of a rank-and-file sailor and a research assistant on the Navy submarine S-48 in the 1932 Navy-Princeton gravity expedition to the West Indies. In 1933, he was assigned to the yacht Caroline (loaned to the Smithsonian Institution for scientific work by Eldridge R. Johnson) to operate a sonic-sounding device during the Johnson-Smithsonian Deep Sea Expedition to the Puerto Rico Trench in 1933. Brown was assigned from the Naval Research Laboratory with the primary duties of sonar and radio operator and had little involvement in scientific work. In 1933 Brown lost his job at the Naval Research Lab due to Depression era budget cutbacks so he joined the U.S. Naval Reserve.

During the 1930s, Brown worked as a soil engineer for the Federal Emergency Relief Administration and then as an administrator for the Ohio Civilian Conservation Corps. Brown and Josephine were divorced briefly in 1937, remarrying in September 1940. Also in 1937, Brown re-enlisted in the U.S. Navy.

In 1938, Brown was promoted to lieutenant; in 1939, he was assigned for a few months as a material engineer for the Navy's flying boats built at the Glenn L. Martin Company in Maryland. He was engaged in magnetic and acoustic mine-sweeping research and development under the Bureau of Ships in Washington, D.C., from October 1940 to March 1941. After the attack on Pearl Harbor in 1941, he was transferred to the Atlantic Fleet Radar School in Norfolk, Virginia, in May 1942. In October 1942, Brown was discharged from Navy service with Brown requesting to resign "for the good of the naval service to escape trial by General Court Martial" and with his official discharge exam listing "no comment" as to the reasons why. After 1944, Brown worked as a radar consultant to the Lockheed-Vega Aircraft Corporation.

After leaving Lockheed, Brown moved to Hawaii where he was temporarily a consultant to the Pearl Harbor Navy Yard due to Commander in Chief of the U.S. Pacific Fleet Admiral Arthur W. Radford's interest in Brown's ideas on Gravitor devices. However, the work was looked at more as a curiosity than any workable device. In 1952, Brown moved to Cleveland, hoping to sell his Gravitor device to the military establishment, but there was little interest in it. In 1955, Brown went to England, then to France. In research testing for the Société nationale des constructions aéronautiques du Sud-Ouest (SNCASO), Brown demonstrated what he thought was an anti-gravity effect in a vacuum with his device. Funding was cut off when SNCASO was merged with SNCASE, forcing Brown to return to the United States in 1956.

Brown became involved in the subject of unidentified flying objects (UFOs) and, in 1956, helped found the National Investigations Committee On Aerial Phenomena (NICAP), although he was forced out as director in 1957 with allegations that Brown was using funds to further anti-gravity research.

In 1958, Brown worked as a research and development consultant for Agnew Bahnson's Whitehall Rand Project, an anti-gravity venture at the Bahnson Company of Winston-Salem, North Carolina. That same year, Brown set up an anti-gravity corporation, Rand International Limited. He filed several patents, but his ideas were met with little success. In the early 1960s, he worked as a physicist for Electrokinetics Inc., of Bala Cynwyd, Pennsylvania. He then went into semi-retirement, living in California. Brown died on October 27, 1985.

== Anti-gravity research ==
In 1921, while experimenting in the lab his parents had set up for him while he was still in high school, Brown discovered an unusual effect while experimenting with a Coolidge tube (hot cathode tube), a type of X-ray vacuum tube with two asymmetrical electrodes. Placing it on a balance scale with the tube's positive electrode facing up, the tube's mass seemed to decrease when the power was on. When the tube's electrode was facing down, the tube's mass seemed to increase. Brown was convinced that he had managed to influence gravity electrically. At Caltech in 1923, Brown tried to convince his instructors about his theories by inviting them to his home laboratory, but they showed little interest. He also invited the press, and the May 26, 1924 edition Los Angeles Evening Express ran a story on Brown titled "Claims Gravity is a Push, not a Pull." After quitting Caltech, Brown studied one year at Denison University, where he claimed that he did a series of experiments with professor of astronomy Paul Alfred Biefeld although the present day Denison University claims they have no record of such experiments being carried out, or of any association between Brown and Biefeld.

Working in his home lab, Brown developed an electrical device he called a "gravitor" or "gravitator", consisting of a block of insulating or dielectric material with electrodes at either end. He received a British patent for it in November 1928. In demonstrations, Brown would mount the unit as a pendulum and apply electrical power, causing the unit to move in one direction. In 1929, Brown published How I Control Gravitation in Science and Invention, claiming these devices produced a mysterious force that interacted with the pull of gravity. He envisioned a future where, if his device could be scaled up, "Multi-impulse gravitators weighing hundreds of tons may propel the ocean liners of the future" or even "fantastic 'space cars'" to Mars.

Brown spent the rest of his life working in his spare time and sometimes on funded projects, trying to prove his ideas on electricity's effect on gravity. He proposed his gravitator as propulsion to General Motors executives in 1930 and as ship propulsion while he was at the Naval Research Laboratory in 1932. After World War II, Brown sought to develop and sell his inventions as a means of propulsion for aircraft and spacecraft. At some point, the phenomenon was given the name "Electrogravitics" based on his belief this was an electricity/gravity phenomenon. At some point, it also gained the moniker "Biefeld–Brown effect", probably coined by Brown to claim Biefeld as his mentor and co-experimenter.

Brown refined his invention over the years and eventually devised designs consisting of metal plates or disks charged with 25,000 to 200,000 volts that would produce a propulsive force, which he continued to claim was an anti-gravity force.

Brown demonstrated a working apparatus to an audience of scientists and military officials in the US, England, and France. Research in the phenomenon was popular in the mid-1950s, at one point the Glenn L. Martin Company placed advertisements looking for scientists who were "interested in gravity", but rapidly declined in popularity thereafter.

A physicist invited to observe Brown's disk device in the early 1950s noted during the demonstration that its motivation force was the well-known phenomenon of "electric wind" and not anti-gravity, saying, "I'm afraid these gentlemen played hooky from their high school physics classes...." Scientists who have since studied Brown's devices have not found any anti-gravity effect, and have attributed the noticed motive force to the more well-understood phenomenon of ionic drift or "ion wind" from the air particles, some of which remained even when Brown put his device inside a vacuum chamber. More recent studies at NASA, held at high voltages and proper vacuum conditions, showed no generated force.

== Legacy ==
In 1979, the author Charles Berlitz and ufologist William L. Moore published The Philadelphia Experiment: Project Invisibility, which purported to be a factual account about the Philadelphia Experiment where a United States Navy experiment accidentally teleported the warship USS Eldridge. Chapter 10 of the book was titled "The Force Fields of Townsend Brown", a retelling of Brown's early work, claiming he was involved in the experiment and implying Brown's electrogravitics was the propulsion used by UFOs. Electrogravitics is also popular with other conspiracy theorists with claims that it is powering the B-2 Stealth Bomber and UFOs and that it may have become a classified subject by 1957. There are further claims that it can be used to generate "free energy".

Brown's research and the "Biefeld–Brown effect" have since become popular pursuits around the world. Amateur experimenters replicate his early experiments in the form of "ionic propulsion lifters" powered by high voltage.

== Sources ==
- Paul Schatzkin, Defying Gravity: The Parallel Universe of T. Townsend Brown (online version), 2005-2006-2007-2008 - Tanglewood Books (archived pages)
- Farrell, Joseph P., "Covert Wars and the Clash of Civilizations" c.2013, Adventures Unlimited Press, Kempton, Illinois, Chapter 9, pages 221-245 ISBN 978-1-939149-04-6
- Paul Schatzkin, The Man Who Mastered Gravity www.ttbrown.com
- Len Kasten, The Secret History of Extraterrestrials: Advanced Technology and the Coming New Race, Inner Traditions / Bear & Co. - 2011, pages 143-147
- William L. Moore, "The Wizard of Electro-gravity" The man who discovered how UFOs are powered, Saga UFO Report, May 1978
