= Static wick =

Aircraft component to discharge static electricity

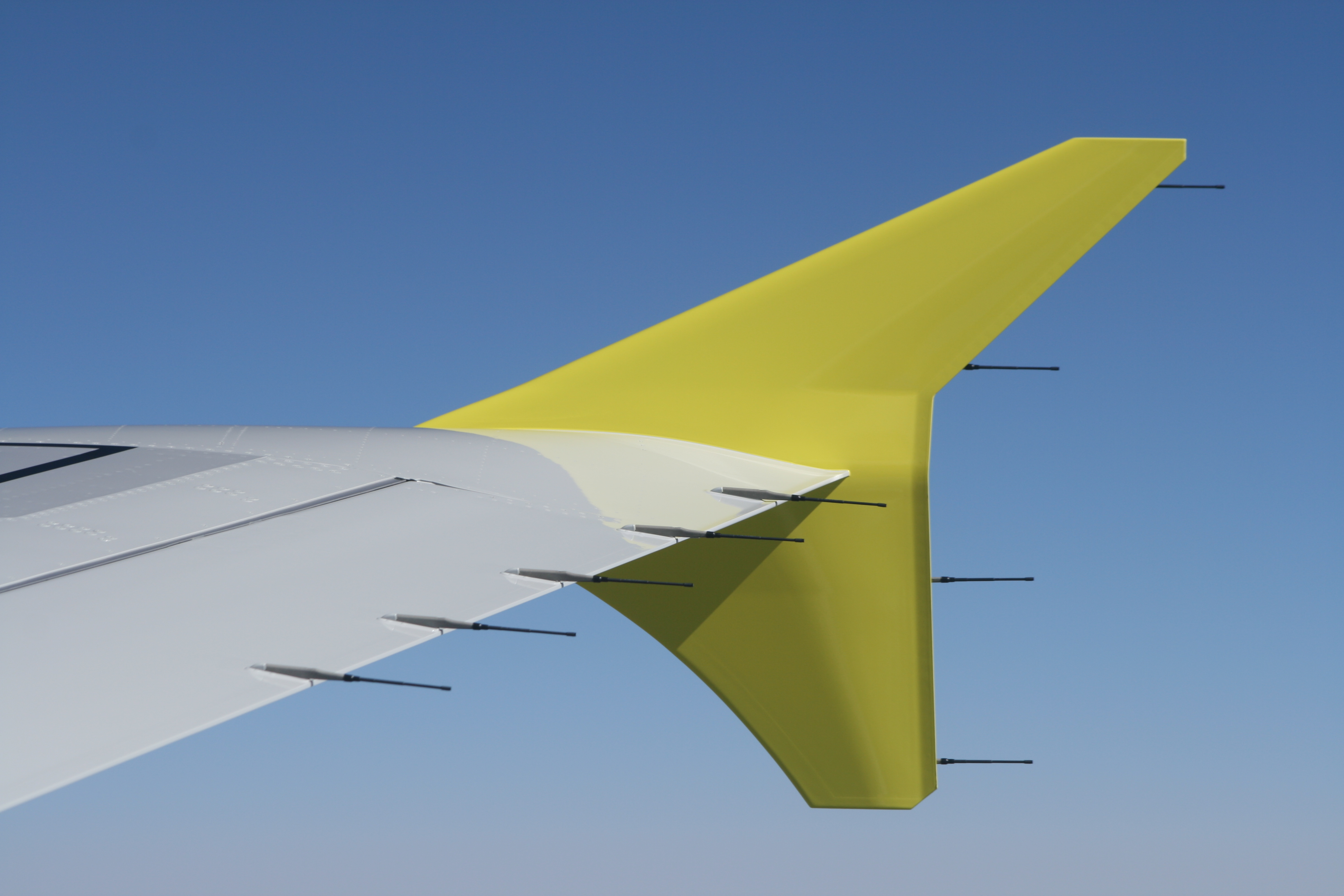
Static wicks on the winglet and aileron of an Germanwings Airbus A319-132

Static wicks, also called static dischargers or static discharge wicks, are devices used to remove static electricity from aircraft in flight. They take the form of small sticks pointing backwards from the wings, and are fitted on almost all civilian aircraft.

== Function ==
Precipitation static is an electrical charge on an airplane caused by flying through rain, snow storms, ice, or dust particles. Charge also accumulates through friction between the aircraft hull and the air. When the aircraft charge is great enough, it discharges into the surrounding air. Without static dischargers, the charge discharges in large batches through pointed aircraft extremities, such as antennas, wing tips, vertical and horizontal stabilizers, and other protrusions. The discharge creates a broad-band radio frequency noise from DC to 1000 MHz, which can affect aircraft communication.

To control this discharge, so as to allow the continuous operation of navigation and radio communication systems, static wicks are installed on the trailing edges of aircraft. These include (electrically grounded) ailerons, elevators, rudder, wing, horizontal and vertical stabilizer tips. Static wicks are high electrical resistance (6–200 megaohm) devices with a lower corona voltage and sharper points than the surrounding aircraft structure. This means that the corona discharge into the atmosphere flows through them, and occurs gradually.

Static wicks are not lightning arresters and do not affect the likelihood of an aircraft being struck by lightning. They will not function if they are not properly bonded to the aircraft. There must be a conductive path from all parts of the airplane to the dischargers, otherwise they will be useless. Access panels, doors, cowls, navigation lights, antenna mounting hardware, control surfaces, etc., can create static noise if they cannot discharge through the static wick.

== History ==
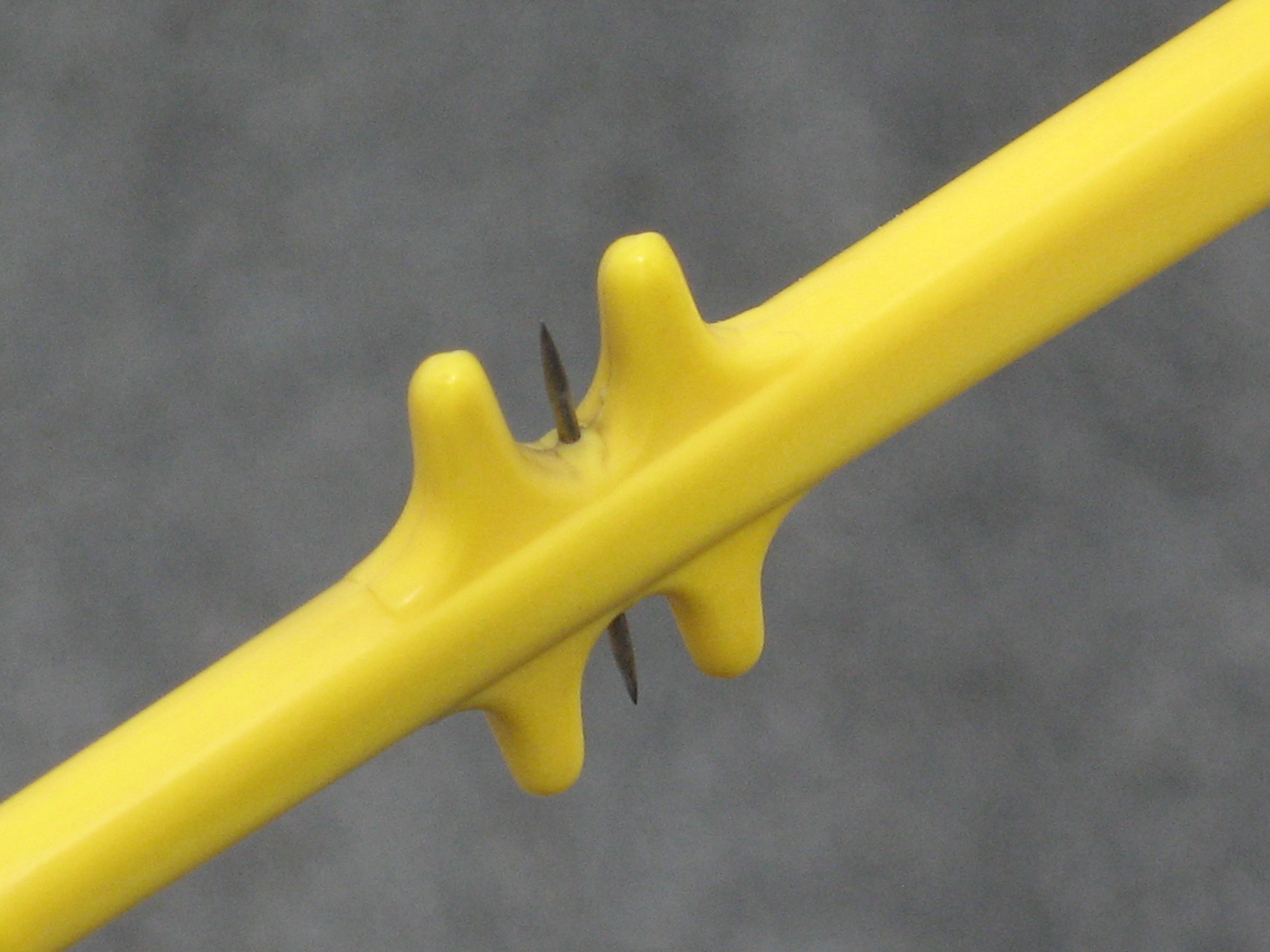
A portion of a static wick on an aircraft. Note the two sharp metal micropoints and the protective yellow plastic.

Static dischargers were first proposed in a patent application by Howard Dudley Blanchard in 1920. At this time most aircraft were constructed from cloth and wood, and rigid body airships were widely used. Therefore, a method of gradually discharging static accumulation was necessary since static discharge on these craft could cause serious damage and start fires. Static discharge is the likely cause of the Hindenburg disaster.

The first static wicks were developed by a joint Army-Navy team led by Dr. Ross Gunn of the Naval Research Laboratory and fitted onto military aircraft during World War II. They were shown to be effective even in extreme weather conditions in 1946 by a United States Army Air Corps team led by Capt. Ernest Lynn Cleveland.

Dayton Granger, an inventor from Florida, received a patent on static wicks in 1950.

== See also ==
- Pan Am Flight 214
- TWA Flight 891
- Precipitation (meteorology)
- Electrostatic discharge
- Triboelectric effect
- Ground loop (electricity)
