= Electrohydrodynamics =

Study of electrically conducting fluids in the presence of electric fields

Electrohydrodynamics (EHD), also known as electro-fluid-dynamics (EFD) or electrokinetics, is the study of the dynamics of electrically charged fluids. Electrohydrodynamics (EHD) is a joint domain of electrodynamics and fluid dynamics mainly focused on the fluid motion induced by electric fields. EHD, in its simplest form, involves the application of an electric field to a fluid medium, resulting in fluid flow, form, or properties manipulation. These mechanisms arise from the interaction between the electric fields and charged particles or polarization effects within the fluid. The generation and movement of charge carriers (ions) in a fluid subjected to an electric field are the underlying physics of all EHD-based technologies.

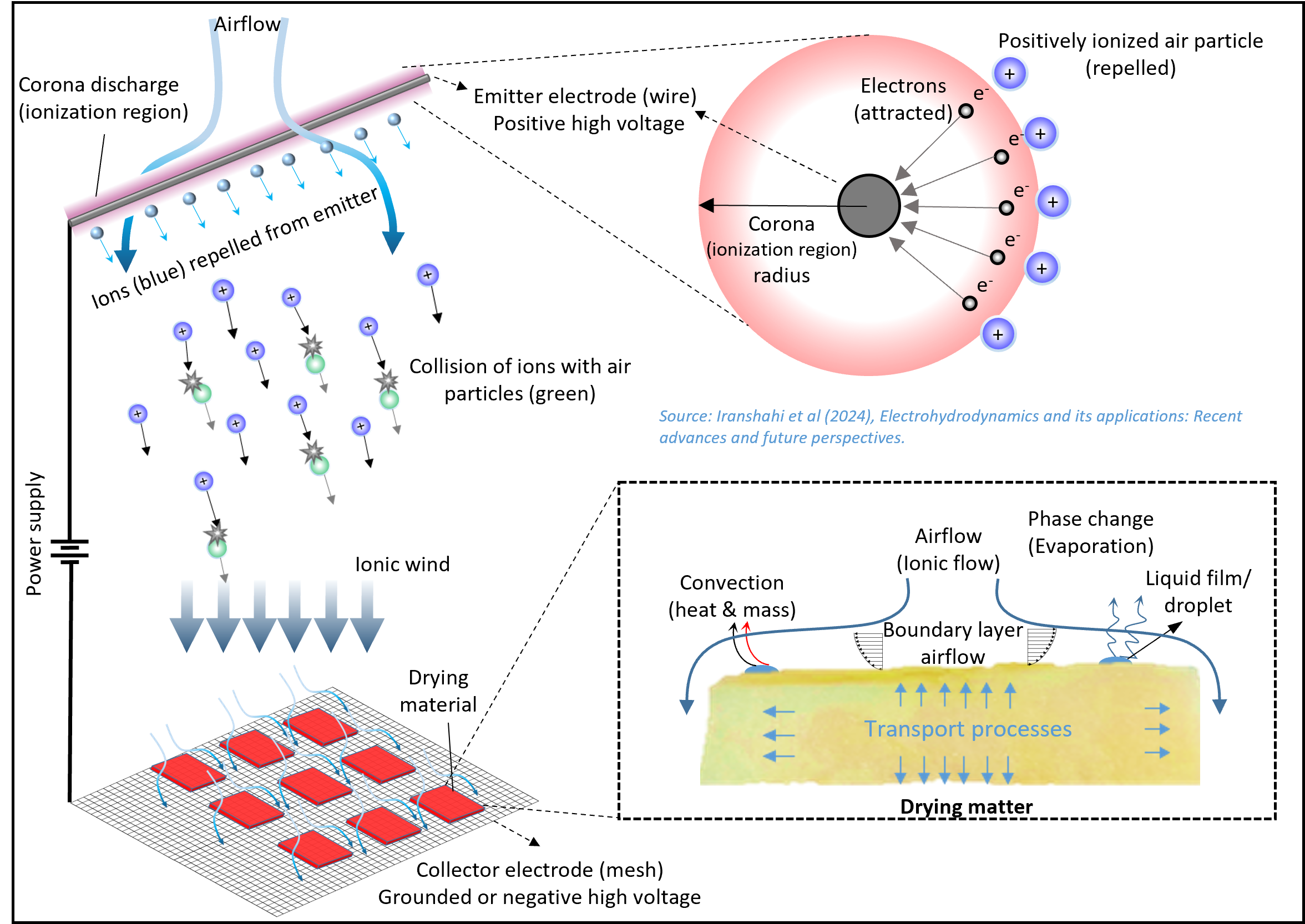
Electrohydrodynamics employed for drying applications (EHD Drying).

The electric forces acting on particles consist of electrostatic (Coulomb) and electrophoresis force (first term in the following equation)., dielectrophoretic force (second term in the following equation), and electrostrictive force (third term in the following equation):

$F_e= \rho_e \overrightarrow{E} - {1 \over 2}\varepsilon_{0}\overrightarrow{E}^2\triangledown\varepsilon_r + {1 \over 2}\varepsilon_{0}\triangledown\Bigl(\overrightarrow{E}^2 \rho_{f}\left ( \frac{\partial \varepsilon_{r}}{\partial \rho_{f}} \right ) \Bigr)$

This electrical force is then inserted in Navier-Stokes equation, as a body (volumetric) force.

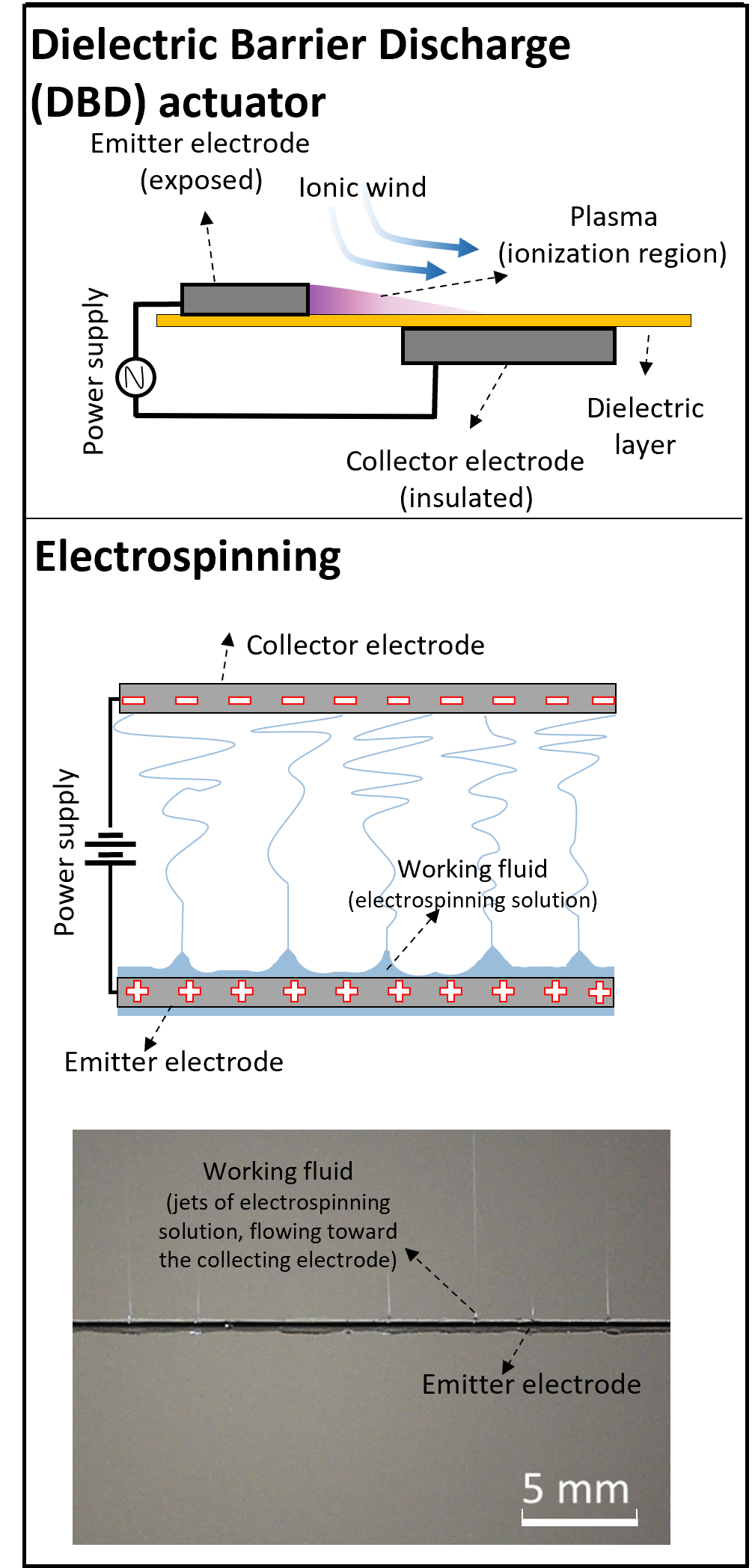
Electrohydrodynamics employed for Airflow control and Electrospinning applications.

EHD covers the following types of particle and fluid transport mechanisms: electrophoresis, electrokinesis, dielectrophoresis, electro-osmosis, and electrorotation. In general, the phenomena relate to the direct conversion of electrical energy into kinetic energy, and vice versa.

In the first instance, shaped electrostatic fields (ESF's) create hydrostatic pressure (HSP, or motion) in dielectric media. When such media are fluids, a flow is produced. If the dielectric is a vacuum or a solid, no flow is produced. Such flow can be directed against the electrodes, generally to move the electrodes. In such case, the moving structure acts as an electric motor. Practical fields of interest of EHD are the common air ioniser, electrohydrodynamic thrusters and EHD cooling systems.

In the second instance, the converse takes place. A powered flow of medium within a shaped electrostatic field adds energy to the system which is picked up as a potential difference by electrodes. In such case, the structure acts as an electrical generator.

== Electrokinesis ==
Electrokinesis is the particle or fluid transport produced by an electric field acting on a fluid having a net mobile charge. (See -kinesis for explanation and further uses of the -kinesis suffix.) Electrokinesis was first observed by Ferdinand Frederic Reuss during 1808, in the electrophoresis of clay particles The effect was also noticed and publicized in the 1920s by Thomas Townsend Brown which he called the Biefeld–Brown effect, although he seems to have misidentified it as an electric field acting on gravity. The flow rate in such a mechanism is linear in the electric field. Electrokinesis is of considerable practical importance in microfluidics, because it offers a way to manipulate and convey fluids in microsystems using only electric fields, with no moving parts.

The force acting on the fluid, is given by the equation
$$F = \frac{I d}{k}$$
where, $F$ is the resulting force, measured in newtons, $I$ is the current, measured in amperes, $d$ is the distance between electrodes, measured in metres, and $k$ is the ion mobility coefficient of the dielectric fluid, measured in m^{2}/(V·s).

If the electrodes are free to move within the fluid, while keeping their distance fixed from each other, then such a force will actually propel the electrodes with respect to the fluid.

Electrokinesis has also been observed in biology, where it was found to cause physical damage to neurons by inciting movement in their membranes. It is discussed in R. J. Elul's "Fixed charge in the cell membrane" (1967).

== Water electrokinetics ==
In October 2003, Dr. Daniel Kwok, Dr. Larry Kostiuk and two graduate students from the University of Alberta discussed a method to convert hydrodynamic to electrical energy by exploiting the natural electrokinetic properties of a liquid such as ordinary tap water, by pumping fluid through tiny micro-channels with a pressure difference. This technology could lead to a practical and clean energy storage device, replacing batteries for devices such as mobile phones or calculators which would be charged up by simply compressing water to high pressure. Pressure would then be released on demand, for the fluid to flow through micro-channels. When water travels, or streams over a surface, the ions in the water "rub" against the solid, leaving the surface slightly charged. Kinetic energy from the moving ions would thus be converted to electrical energy. Although the power generated from a single channel is extremely small, millions of parallel micro-channels can be used to increase the power output. This streaming potential, water-flow phenomenon was discovered in 1859 by German physicist Georg Hermann Quincke.

== Electrokinetic instabilities ==
The fluid flows in microfluidic and nanofluidic devices are often stable and strongly damped by viscous forces (with Reynolds numbers of order unity or smaller). However, heterogeneous ionic conductivity fields in the presence of applied electric fields can, under certain conditions, generate an unstable flow field owing to electrokinetic instabilities (EKI). Conductivity gradients are prevalent in on-chip electrokinetic processes such as preconcentration methods (e.g. field amplified sample stacking and isoelectric focusing), multidimensional assays, and systems with poorly specified sample chemistry. The dynamics and periodic morphology of electrokinetic instabilities are similar to other systems with Rayleigh–Taylor instabilities. The particular case of a flat plane geometry with homogeneous ions injection in the bottom side leads to a mathematical frame identical to the Rayleigh–Bénard convection.

EKI's can be leveraged for rapid mixing or can cause undesirable dispersion in sample injection, separation and stacking. These instabilities are caused by a coupling of electric fields and ionic conductivity gradients that results in an electric body force. This coupling results in an electric body force in the bulk liquid, outside the electric double layer, that can generate temporal, convective, and absolute flow instabilities. Electrokinetic flows with conductivity gradients become unstable when the electroviscous stretching and folding of conductivity interfaces grows faster than the dissipative effect of molecular diffusion.

Since these flows are characterized by low velocities and small length scales, the Reynolds number is below 0.01 and the flow is laminar. The onset of instability in these flows is best described as an electric "Rayleigh number".

== Misc ==
Liquids can be printed at nanoscale by pyro-EHD.

== See also ==
- Magnetohydrodynamic drive
- Magnetohydrodynamics
- Electrodynamic droplet deformation
- Electrospray
- Electrokinetic phenomena
- Optoelectrofluidics
- Electrostatic precipitator
- List of textbooks in electromagnetism
