= Anti-gravity =

Physical and science fiction concept

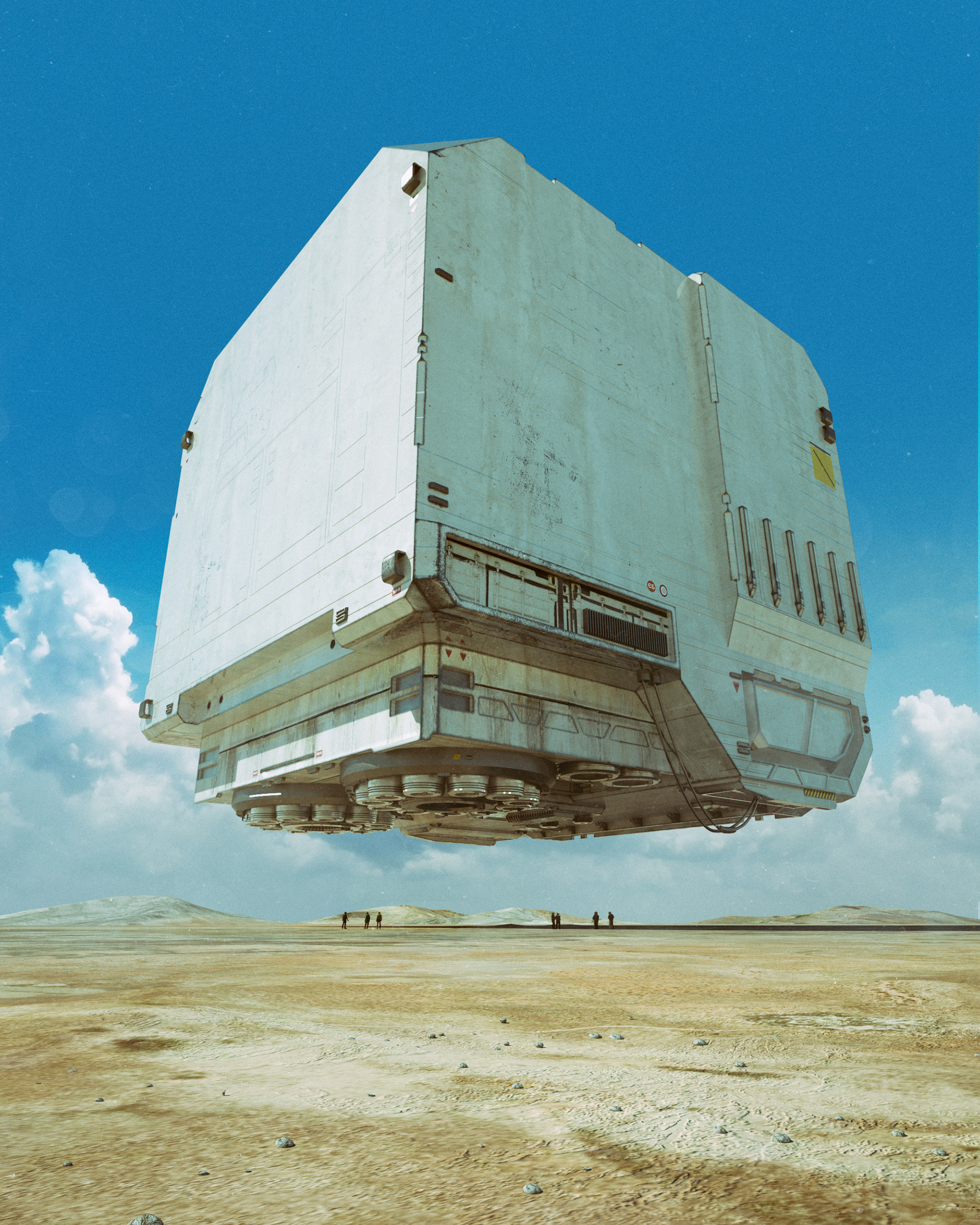
Artistic depiction of a fictional anti-gravity vehicle

Anti-gravity is the concept of a force that would exactly oppose the force of gravity. Anti-gravity does not refer to either the lack of weight under gravity experienced in free fall or orbit, or to balancing the force of gravity with some other force, such as electromagnetism, aerodynamic lift, or ion-propelled "lifters", which fly in the air by moving air with electromagnetic fields.

Historically, anti-gravity was considered a possibility after the discovery of antimatter. Once the nature of antimatter was more clearly established, it was clear that gravity works the same for both matter and antimatter. Experimental measurements rule out repulsion between antihydrogen and the mass of the Earth. Under the current laws of physics, anti-gravity is not possible without some form of exotic matter such as negative mass (which has never been observed).

Anti-gravity is a recurring concept in science fiction.

== Theoretical probability ==
Under the laws of general relativity, anti-gravity is impossible except under contrived circumstances. Under that theory, and particle physics, gravity is mass-energy, a quantity believed to always be positive. It is always attractive and never repulsive.

During the close of the twentieth century NASA provided funding for the Breakthrough Propulsion Physics Program (BPP) from 1996 through 2002. This program studied a number of "far out" designs for space propulsion that were not receiving funding through normal university or commercial channels. Anti-gravity-like concepts were listed under "approaches categorized as non-viable" since the study found no evidence of anti-gravity-like forces. So many inappropriate proposals were submitted that NASA developed a screening guide for reviewers.

== History ==
Attempts to understand why gravity is solely an attractive force go back at least as far as James Clerk Maxwell in the late nineteenth century. He noted that existence of unlike charges in electromagnetism was the root of its fundamental difference from gravity. With the discovery of general relativity and the emergence of particle physics in the twentieth century this difference seemed even more fundamental. The "charge" in the theory of gravity is mass-energy, a quantity believed to always be positive. Thus gravity seemed to always be attractive and never repulsive. Two significant possible exceptions emerged, however –in quantum physics and at cosmological scales.

=== Antimatter gravitation ===
In 1928 Paul Dirac produced the first relativistic quantum mechanics theory. The theory accurately predicted properties of the electron but it also has a second solution. In 1931 Robert Oppenheimer showed that Dirac's original interpretation of the second solution was incorrect and Dirac responded with a new proposal: the second solution was a positively charged "anti-electron". Dirac also said that every other particle should have an opposite charged counterpart. With the discovery of the positron in 1932 and the antiproton in 1955, this theoretical concept of antimatter was grounded in empirical evidence.

Dirac's theory did not include gravitation and there remains no consistent theory that combines both quantum mechanics and general relativity. A hypothetical negative mass charge in Newton's equations or general relativity is theoretically consistent even though no observations support this concept. Since antimatter is extremely rare, the possibility remained that repulsion between matter and antimatter would lead to antigravity.

By 1956 the scientific impossibility of antigravity was a subject of theoretical analysis. Three more comprehensive arguments were published soon thereafter. In 1958, Philip Morrison showed that repulsion by mass would imply failure of conservation of energy in Earth's gravitational field. In 1959, Leonard I. Schiff showed that in quantum field theory the virtual anti-electron contribution to the vacuum polarization would break the equivalence of inertial and gravitational mass contrary to the results of the Eötvös experiment. Then in 1961, Myron L. Good noted that the longest-lived K meson is a superposition of a particle and its antiparticle; if these two particles responded differently to gravity the long-lived K meson would decay. Despite these arguments, new theories motivated by issues in cosmology and uncertainties in particle physics have been proposed in which the gravitational interaction of matter and antimatter could be repulsive.

=== Experiments ===
Attempts to measure the gravitational force on antimatter particles is extremely challenging. For matter particles, the equivalence of inertial and gravitational mass, known as the weak equivalence principle, has been demonstrated to a precision of 10^{−15}. However the technique used differential electrostatic accelerometers on a pair of test masses composed of titanium and of platinum, all in an orbiting satellite. Producing antimatter hydrogen atoms requires a source of antiprotons like a particle accelerator combined with a source of positrons, making a satellite, two-mass experiment impractical. In 2023, the amount of antihydrogen escaping from the top and bottom of a vertical vacuum chamber at CERN was compared, ruling out repulsive gravity between antihydrogen and Earth's mass.

== Studies, empirical claims and commercial efforts ==
There have been a number of studies, attempts to build anti-gravity devices, and a small number of reports of anti-gravity-like effects in popular and scientific literature. None of the examples that follow are accepted as reproducible examples of anti-gravity.

=== Thomas Townsend Brown's gravitator ===
In 1921, while still in high school, Thomas Townsend Brown found that a high-voltage Coolidge tube seemed to change mass depending on its orientation on a balance scale. Through the 1920s Brown developed this into devices that combined high voltages with materials with high dielectric constants (essentially large capacitors); he called such a device a "gravitator". Brown made the claim to observers and in the media that his experiments were showing anti-gravity effects. Brown would continue his work and produced a series of high-voltage devices in the following years in attempts to sell his ideas to aircraft companies and the military. He coined the names Biefeld–Brown effect and electrogravitics in conjunction with his devices. Brown tested his asymmetrical capacitor devices in a vacuum, supposedly showing it was not a more down-to-earth electrohydrodynamic effect generated by high voltage ion flow in air.

Electrogravitics is a popular topic in ufology, anti-gravity, free energy, with government conspiracy theorists and related websites, in books and publications with claims that the technology became highly classified in the early 1960s and that it is used to power UFOs and the B-2 bomber. There is also research and videos on the internet purported to show lifter-style capacitor devices working in a vacuum, therefore not receiving propulsion from ion drift or ion wind being generated in air.

Follow-up studies on Brown's work and other claims have been conducted by R. L. Talley in a 1990 US Air Force study, NASA scientist Jonathan Campbell in a 2003 experiment, and Martin Tajmar in a 2004 paper. Talley attempted to measure the effect in high vacuum chamber with up to 19kV voltage differences but reported that no force was generated above the detection limit of 2 × 10^{−9} N. Tajmar and colleagues made a comprehensive search but found no effects in vacuum with steady electric fields. The conclusion from these experiments was that the effect observed by Brown was "ion wind"; no experiments found evidence that thrust could be observed in a vacuum.

=== Gravity Research Foundation ===
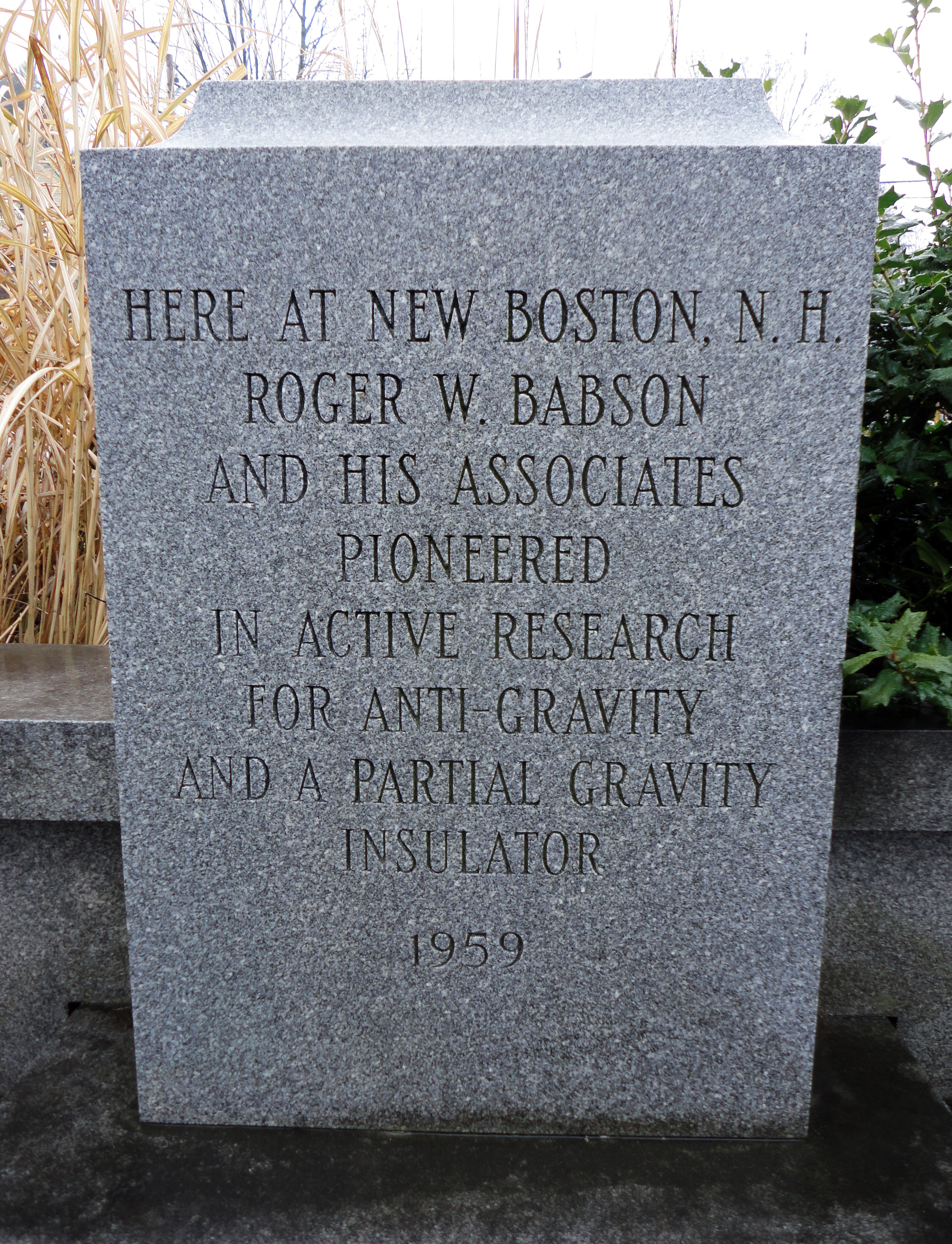
A monument at Babson College dedicated to Roger Babson for research into anti-gravity and partial gravity insulators

In 1948 businessman Roger Babson (founder of Babson College) formed the Gravity Research Foundation to study ways to reduce the effects of gravity. Their efforts were initially somewhat "crankish", but they held occasional conferences that drew such people as Clarence Birdseye, known for his frozen-food products, and helicopter pioneer Igor Sikorsky. Over time the Foundation turned its attention away from trying to control gravity, to simply better understanding it. The Foundation nearly disappeared after Babson's death in 1967. However, it continues to run an essay award, offering prizes of up to $4,000. As of 2017, it is still administered out of Wellesley, Massachusetts, by George Rideout Jr., son of the foundation's original director. Winners include California astrophysicist George F. Smoot (1993), who later won the 2006 Nobel Prize in Physics, and Gerard 't Hooft (2015) who previously won the 1999 Nobel Prize in Physics.

=== Gyroscopic devices ===
Gyroscopes produce a force when twisted that operates "out of plane" and can appear to lift themselves against gravity. Although this force is well understood to be illusory, even under Newtonian models, it has nevertheless generated numerous claims of anti-gravity devices and any number of patented devices. None of these devices has ever been demonstrated to work under controlled conditions, and they have often become the subject of conspiracy theories as a result.

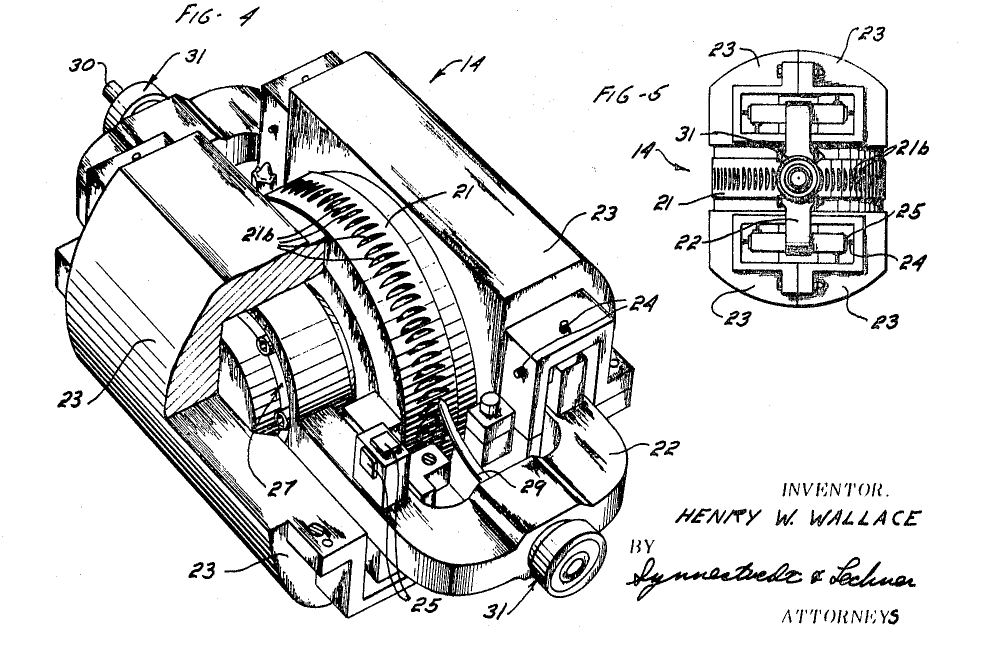
Henry Wallace's 1968 "kinemassic field" generator which he claimed would created a "gravitomagnetic" field

Another "rotating device" example is shown in a series of patents granted to Henry Wallace between 1968 and 1974. His devices consist of rapidly spinning disks of brass, a material made up largely of elements with a total half-integer nuclear spin. He claimed that by rapidly rotating a disk of such material, the nuclear spin became aligned, and as a result created a "gravitomagnetic" field in a fashion similar to the magnetic field created by the Barnett effect. No independent testing or public demonstration of these devices is known.

In 1989, it was reported that a weight decreases along the axis of a right spinning gyroscope. A test of this claim a year later yielded null results. A recommendation was made to conduct further tests at a 1999 AIP conference.

=== Gravitoelectric coupling ===
In 1992, the Russian researcher Eugene Podkletnov claimed to have discovered, while experimenting with superconductors, that a fast rotating superconductor reduces the gravitational effect. Many studies have attempted to reproduce Podkletnov's experiment, always to negative results.

Douglas Torr, of the University of Alabama in Huntsville proposed how a time-dependent magnetic field could cause the spins of the lattice ions in a superconductor to generate detectable gravitomagnetic and gravitoelectric fields in a series of papers published between 1991 and 1993. In 1999, a Miss Li appeared in Popular Mechanics, claiming to have constructed a working prototype to generate what she described as "AC Gravity." No further evidence of this prototype has been offered.

Douglas Torr and Timir Datta were involved in the development of a "gravity generator" at the University of South Carolina. According to a leaked document from the Office of Technology Transfer at the University of South Carolina and confirmed to Wired reporter Charles Platt in 1998, the device would create a "force beam" in any desired direction and the university planned to patent and license this device. No further information about this university research project or the "Gravity Generator" device was ever made public.

== Göde Award ==
The Institute for Gravity Research of the Göde Scientific Foundation has tried to reproduce many of the different experiments which claim any "anti-gravity" effects. All attempts by this group to observe an anti-gravity effect by reproducing past experiments have been unsuccessful thus far. The foundation has offered a reward of one million euros for a reproducible anti-gravity experiment.

== In fiction ==
The existence of anti-gravity is a common theme in science fiction. The Encyclopedia of Science Fiction lists Francis Godwin's posthumously published 1638 novel The Man in the Moone, where a "semi-magical" stone has the power to make gravity stronger or weaker, as the earliest variation of the theme. The first story to use anti-gravity for the purpose of space travel, as well as the first to treat the subject from a scientific rather than supernatural angle, was George Tucker's 1827 novel A Voyage to the Moon.

=== Apergy ===
Apergy is a term invented by Percy Greg for an imaginary anti-gravitational force used in his 1880 sword and planet novel Across the Zodiac. The term was later adopted by other fiction authors such as John Jacob Astor IV in his 1894 science fiction novel A Journey in Other Worlds.

== See also ==
- Area 51
- Artificial gravity
- Burkhard Heim
- Casimir effect
- Clinostat
- Exotic matter
- Gravitational interaction of antimatter
- Gravitational shielding
- Gravitational wave
- Ion-propelled aircraft
- Heim theory
- Levitation (physics)
  - Aerodynamic levitation
  - Electrostatic levitation
  - Magnetic levitation
  - Optical levitation
- Nazi UFOs
- Negative mass
- Reactionless drive
- Tractor beam
