= Electrorotation =

Circular movement of a polarized particle

Electrorotation is the circular movement of an electrically polarized particle. Similar to the slip of an electric motor, it can arise from a phase lag between an applied rotating electric field and the respective relaxation processes and may thus be used to investigate the processes or, if these are known or can be accurately described by models, to determine particle properties. The method is popular in cellular biophysics, as it allows measuring cellular properties like conductivity and permittivity of cellular compartments and their surrounding membranes.

== See also ==
- Dielectric relaxation
- Dielectrophoresis
- Membrane potential
