= Dielectrophoresis =

Particle motion in a non-uniform electric field due to dipole-field interactions

Dielectrophoresis assembling cancer cells in a 3D microfluidic model.

Dielectrophoresis (DEP) is a phenomenon in which a force is exerted on a polarizable particle when it is subjected to a non-uniform electric field. This force does not require the particle to be charged. All particles exhibit dielectrophoretic activity in the presence of electric fields. However, the strength of the force depends strongly on the medium and particles' electrical properties, on the particles' shape and size, as well as on the frequency of the electric field. Consequently, fields of a particular frequency can manipulate particles with great selectivity. This has allowed, for example, the separation of cells or the orientation and manipulation of nanoparticles and nanowires. Furthermore, a study of the change in DEP force as a function of frequency can allow the electrical (or electrophysiological in the case of cells) properties of the particle to be elucidated.

== Background and properties ==
Although the phenomenon we now call dielectrophoresis was described in passing as far back as the early 20th century, it was only subject to serious study, named and first understood by Herbert Pohl in the 1950s. Recently, dielectrophoresis has been revived due to its potential in the manipulation of microparticles, nanoparticles and cells.

Dielectrophoresis occurs when a polarizable particle is suspended in a non-uniform electric field. The electric field polarizes the particle, and the poles then experience a force along the field lines, which can be either attractive or repulsive according to the orientation on the dipole. Since the field is non-uniform, the pole experiencing the greatest electric field will dominate over the other, and the particle will move. The orientation of the dipole is dependent on the relative polarizability of the particle and medium, in accordance with Maxwell–Wagner–Sillars polarization. Since the direction of the force is dependent on field gradient rather than field direction, DEP will occur in AC as well as DC electric fields; polarization (and hence the direction of the force) will depend on the relative polarizabilities of particle and medium. If the particle moves in the direction of increasing electric field, the behavior is referred to as positive DEP (sometime pDEP), if acting to move the particle away from high field regions, it is known as negative DEP (or nDEP). As the relative polarizabilities of the particle and medium are frequency-dependent, varying the energizing signal and measuring the way in which the force changes can be used to determine the electrical properties of particles; this also allows the elimination of electrophoretic motion of particles due to inherent particle charge.

Phenomena associated with dielectrophoresis are electrorotation and traveling wave dielectrophoresis (TWDEP). These require complex signal generation equipment in order to create the required rotating or traveling electric fields, and as a result of this complexity have found less favor among researchers than conventional dielectrophoresis.

== Dielectrophoretic force ==
The simplest theoretical model is that of a homogeneous sphere surrounded by a conducting dielectric medium. For a homogeneous sphere of radius $r$ and complex permittivity $\varepsilon_p^*$ in a medium with complex permittivity $\varepsilon_m^*$ the (time-averaged) DEP force is:

$$\langle F_\mathrm{DEP} \rangle = 2\pi r^3\varepsilon_m \textrm{Re}\left\{\frac{\varepsilon^*_p - \varepsilon^*_m}{\varepsilon^*_p + 2\varepsilon^*_m}\right\}\nabla \left|\vec{E}_{rms}\right|^2$$

The factor in curly brackets is known as the complex Clausius-Mossotti function and contains all the frequency dependence of the DEP force. Where the particle consists of nested spheres – the most common example of which is the approximation of a spherical cell composed of an inner part (the cytoplasm) surrounded by an outer layer (the cell membrane) – then this can be represented by nested expressions for the shells and the way in which they interact, allowing the properties to be elucidated where there are sufficient parameters related to the number of unknowns being sought. For a more general field-aligned ellipsoid of radius $r$ and length $l$ with complex dielectric constant $\varepsilon_p^*$ in a medium with complex dielectric constant $\varepsilon_m^*$ the time-dependent dielectrophoretic force is given by:

$$F_\mathrm{DEP} = \frac{\pi r^2 l}{3}\varepsilon_m \textrm{Re}\left\{\frac{\varepsilon^*_p - \varepsilon^*_m}{\varepsilon^*_m}\right\}\nabla \left|\vec{E}\right|^2$$

The complex dielectric constant is $\varepsilon^* = \varepsilon + \frac{i\sigma}{\omega}$, where $\varepsilon$ is the dielectric constant, $\sigma$ is the electrical conductivity, $\omega$ is the field frequency, and $i$ is the imaginary unit. This expression has been useful for approximating the dielectrophoretic behavior of particles such as red blood cells (as oblate spheroids) or long thin tubes (as prolate ellipsoids) allowing the approximation of the dielectrophoretic response of carbon nanotubes or tobacco mosaic viruses in suspension. These equations are accurate for particles when the electric field gradients are not very large (e.g., close to electrode edges) or when the particle is not moving along an axis in which the field gradient is zero (such as at the center of an axisymmetric electrode array), as the equations only take into account the dipole formed and not higher order polarization. When the electric field gradients are large, or when there is a field null running through the center of the particle, higher order terms become relevant, and result in higher forces. To be precise, the time-dependent equation only applies to lossless particles, because loss creates a lag between the field and the induced dipole. When averaged, the effect cancels out and the equation holds true for lossy particles as well. An equivalent time-averaged equation can be easily obtained by replacing E with E_{rms}, or, for sinusoidal voltages by dividing the right hand side by 2. These models ignores the fact that cells have a complex internal structure and are heterogeneous. A multi-shell model in a low conducting medium can be used to obtain information of the membrane conductivity and the permittivity of the cytoplasm. For a cell with a shell surrounding a homogeneous core with its surrounding medium considered as a layer, as seen in Figure 2, the overall dielectric response is obtained from a combination of the properties of the shell and core.

$$\varepsilon_{1eff}^*(\omega)= \varepsilon_2^*\frac{(\frac{r_2}{r_1})^3+2\frac{\varepsilon_1^*-\varepsilon_2^*}{\varepsilon_1^*+2\varepsilon_2^*}}{(\frac{r_2}{r_1})^3-\frac{\varepsilon_1^*-\varepsilon_2^*}{\varepsilon_1^*+2\varepsilon_2^*}}$$

where 1 is the core (in cellular terms, the cytoplasm), 2 is the shell (in a cell, the membrane). r1 is the radius from the centre of the sphere to the inside of the shell, and r2 is the radius from the centre of the sphere to the outside of the shell.

== Applications ==
Dielectrophoresis can be used to manipulate, transport, separate and sort different types of particles. DEP is being applied in fields such as medical diagnostics, drug discovery, cell therapeutics, and particle filtration.

DEP has been also used in conjunction with semiconductor chip technology for the development of DEP array technology for the simultaneous management of thousands of cells in microfluidic devices. Single microelectrodes on the floor of a flow cell are managed by a CMOS chip to form thousands of dielectrophoretic "cages", each capable of capturing and moving one single cell under control of routing software.

As biological cells have dielectric properties, dielectrophoresis has many biological and medical applications. Instruments capable of separating cancer cells from healthy cells have been made as well as isolating single cells from forensic mixed samples. Platelets have been separated from whole blood with a DEP-activated cell sorter.

DEP has made it possible to characterize and manipulate biological particles like blood cells, stem cells, neurons, pancreatic β cells, DNA, chromosomes, proteins and viruses. DEP can be used to separate particles with different sign polarizabilities as they move in different directions at a given frequency of the AC field applied. DEP has been applied for the separation of live and dead cells, with the remaining live cells still viable after separation or to force contact between selected single cells to study cell-cell interaction. DEP has been used to separate strains of bacteria and viruses. DEP can also be used to detect apoptosis soon after drug induction measuring the changes in electrophysiological properties.

=== As a cell characterisation tool ===
DEP is mainly used for characterising cells measuring the changes in their electrical properties. To do this, many techniques are available to quantify the dielectrophoretic response, as it is not possible to directly measure the DEP force. These techniques rely on indirect measures, obtaining a proportional response of the strength and direction of the force that needs to be scaled to the model spectrum. So most models only consider the Clausius-Mossotti factor of a particle. The most used techniques are collection rate measurements: this is the simplest and most used technique – electrodes are submerged in a suspension with a known concentration of particles and the particles that collect at the electrode are counted; crossover measurements: the crossover frequency between positive and negative DEP is measured to characterise particles – this technique is used for smaller particles (e.g. viruses), that are difficult to count with the previous technique; particle velocity measurements: this technique measures the velocity and direction of the particles in an electric field gradient; measurement of the levitation height: the levitation height of a particle is proportional to the negative DEP force that is applied. Thus, this technique is good for characterising single particles and is mainly used for larger particles such as cells; impedance sensing: particles collecting at the electrode edge have an influence on the impedance of the electrodes – this change can be monitored to quantify DEP. In order to study larger populations of cells, the properties can be obtained by analysing the dielectrophoretic spectra.

== Implementation ==
=== Electrode geometries ===
At the start, electrodes were made mainly from wires or metal sheets. Nowadays, the electric field in DEP is created by means of electrodes which minimize the magnitude of the voltage needed. This has been possible using fabrication techniques such as photolithography, laser ablation and electron beam patterning. These small electrodes allow the handling of small bioparticles. The most used electrode geometries are isometric, polynomial, interdigitated, and crossbar. Isometric geometry is effective for particle manipulation with DEP but repelled particles do not collect in well defined areas and so separation into two homogeneous groups is difficult. Polynomial is a new geometry producing well defined differences in regions of high and low forces and so particles could be collected by positive and negative DEP. This electrode geometry showed that the electrical field was highest at the middle of the inter-electrode gaps. Interdigitated geometry comprises alternating electrode fingers of opposing polarities and is mainly used for dielectrophoretic trapping and analysis. Crossbar geometry is potentially useful for networks of interconnects.

=== DEP-well electrodes ===
These electrodes were developed to offer a high-throughput yet low-cost alternative to conventional electrode structures for DEP. Rather than use photolithographic methods or other microengineering approaches, DEP-well electrodes are constructed from stacking successive conductive and insulating layers in a laminate, after which multiple "wells" are drilled through the structure. If one examines the walls of these wells, the layers appear as interdigitated electrodes running continuously around the walls of the tube. When alternating conducting layers are connected to the two phases of an AC signal, a field gradient formed along the walls moves cells by DEP.

DEP-wells can be used in two modes; for analysis or separation. In the first, the dielectrophoretic properties of cells can be monitored by light absorption measurements: positive DEP attracts the cells to the wall of the well, thus when probed with a light beam the well the light intensity increases through the well. The opposite is true for negative DEP, in which the light beam becomes obscured by the cells. Alternatively, the approach can be used to build a separator, where mixtures of cells are forced through large numbers (>100) of wells in parallel; those experiencing positive DEP are trapped in the device whilst the rest are flushed. Switching off the field allows release of the trapped cells into a separate container. The highly parallel nature of the approach means that the chip can sort cells at much higher speeds, comparable to those used by MACS and FACS.

This approach offers many advantages over conventional, photolithography-based devices but reducing cost, increasing the amount of sample which can be analysed simultaneously, and the simplicity of cell motion reduced to one dimension (where cells can only move radially towards or away from the centre of the well). Devices manufactured to use the DEP-well principle are marketed under the DEPtech brand.

=== Dielectrophoresis field-flow fractionation ===
The utilization of the difference between dielectrophoretic forces exerted on different particles in nonuniform electric fields is known as DEP separation. The exploitation of DEP forces has been classified into two groups: DEP migration and DEP retention. DEP migration uses DEP forces that exert opposite signs of force on different particle types to attract some of the particles and repel others. DEP retention uses the balance between DEP and fluid-flow forces. Particles experiencing repulsive and weak attractive DEP forces are eluted by fluid flow, whereas particles experiencing strong attractive DEP forces are trapped at electrode edges against flow drag.

Dielectrophoresis field-flow fractionation (DEP-FFF), introduced by Davis and Giddings, is a family of chromatographic-like separation methods. In DEP-FFF, DEP forces are combined with drag flow to fractionate a sample of different types of particles. Particles are injected into a carrier flow that passes through the separation chamber, with an external separating force (a DEP force) being applied perpendicular to the flow. By means of different factors, such as diffusion and steric, hydrodynamic, dielectric and other effects, or a combination thereof, particles (<1 μm in diameter) with different dielectric or diffusive properties attain different positions away from the chamber wall, which, in turn, exhibit different characteristic concentration profile. Particles that move further away from the wall reach higher positions in the parabolic velocity profile of the liquid flowing through the chamber and will be eluted from the chamber at a faster rate.

=== Optical dielectrophoresis ===
The use of photoconductive materials (for example, in lab-on-chip devices) allows for localized inducement of dielectrophoretic forces through the application of light. In addition, one can project an image to induce forces in a patterned illumination area, allowing for some complex manipulations. When manipulating living cells, optical dielectrophoresis provides a non-damaging alternative to optical tweezers, as the intensity of light is about 1000 times less.
