= Peek's law =

Law of Physics

In physics, Peek's law defines the electric potential gap necessary for triggering a corona discharge between two wires:

$$e_v = m_v g_v r \ln \left ({S \over r} \right )$$

e_{v} is the "visual critical corona voltage" or "corona inception voltage" (CIV), the voltage required to initiate a visible corona discharge between the wires. It is named after Frank William Peek (1881–1933).

m_{v} is an irregularity factor to account for the condition of the wires. For smooth, polished wires, m_{v} = 1. For roughened, dirty or weathered wires, 0.98 to 0.93, and for cables, 0.87 to 0.83, namely the surface irregularities result in diminishing the corona threshold voltage.

r is the radius of the wires in cm.

S is the distance between the center of the wires.

g_{v} is the "visual critical" electric field, and is given by:

$$g_v = g_0 \delta \left ( 1 + {c \over \sqrt{\delta r}} \right )$$

δ is the air density factor with respect to SATP (25°C and 76 cmHg):

$$\delta = {\rho \over \rho_{SATP}}$$

g_{0} is the "disruptive electric field."

c is an empirical dimensional constant.

The values for the last two parameters are usually considered to be about 30-32 kV/cm (in air) and 0.301 cm^{½} respectively. This latter law can be considered to hold also in different setups, where the corresponding voltage is different due to geometric reasons.
