= Ion wind =

Charged-particle flow due to high electrostatic potential

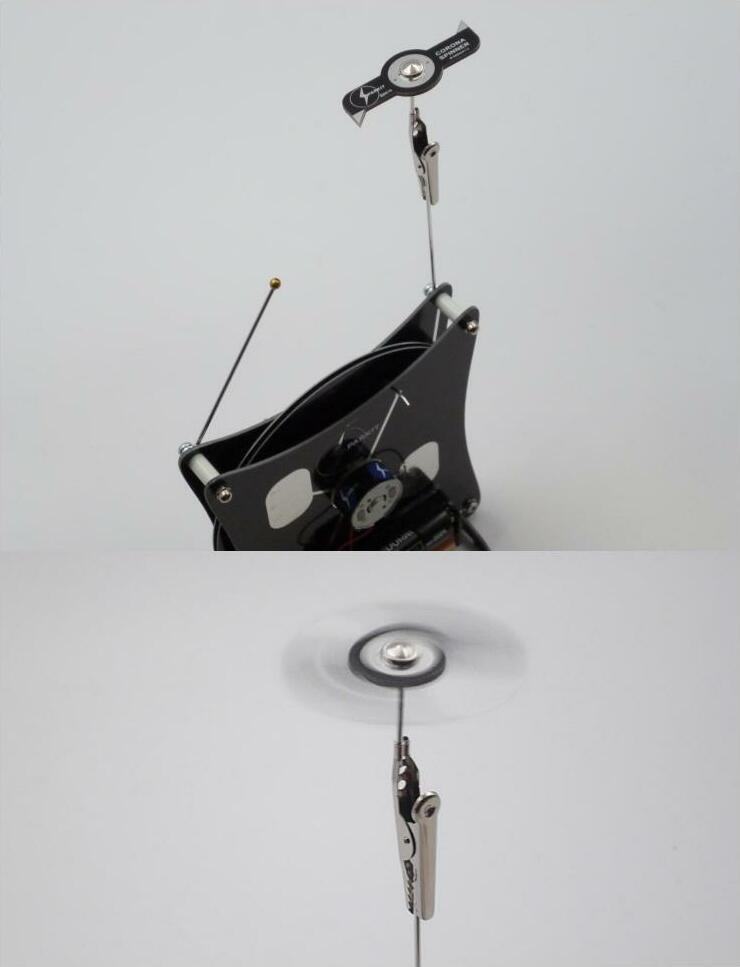
An electrostatic pinwheel, or corona spinner, attached to a small Wimshurst machine (electrostatic generator) is shown stationary and rotating

Ion wind, ionic wind, corona wind, or electric wind is the airflow of charged particles induced by electrostatic forces linked to corona discharge arising at the tips of conductors with sufficiently sharp points, edges or wires subjected to high voltage relative to the ground. Ion wind is an electrohydrodynamic phenomenon. Ion wind generators can also be considered electrohydrodynamic thrusters.

The term "ionic wind" is considered a misnomer due to misconceptions that only positive and negative ions were primarily involved in the phenomenon. A 2018 study found that electrons play a larger role than negative ions during the negative voltage period. As a result, the term "electric wind" has been suggested as a more accurate terminology.

This phenomenon is now used in an MIT ionic wind plane, the first solid-state plane, developed in 2018.

== History ==
B. Wilson in 1750 demonstrated the recoil force associated to the same corona discharge and precursor to the ion thruster was the corona discharge pinwheel. The corona discharge from the freely rotating pinwheel arm with ends bent to sharp points gives the air a space charge, which repels the point because the polarity is the same for the point and the air.

Francis Hauksbee, curator of instruments for the Royal Society of London, made the earliest report of electric wind in 1709. Myron Robinson completed an extensive bibliography and literature review during the 1950s resurgence of interest in the phenomena.

In 2018, researchers from South Korea and Slovenia used Schlieren photography to experimentally determine that electrons and ions play an important role in generating ionic wind. The study was the first to provide direct evidence that the electrohydrodynamic force responsible for the ionic wind is caused by a charged particle drag that occurs as the electrons and ions push the neutral particles away.

In 2018, a team of MIT researchers built and successfully flew the first-ever prototype plane propelled by ionic wind, MIT EAD Airframe Version 2.

== Mechanism ==
Net electric charges on conductors, including local charge distributions associated with dipoles, reside entirely on their external surface (see Faraday cage) and tend to concentrate more around sharp points and edges than on flat surfaces. This means that the electric field generated by charges on a sharp conductive point is much stronger than the field generated by the same charge residing on a large, smooth, spherical conductive shell. When this electric field strength exceeds what is known as the corona discharge inception voltage (CIV) gradient, it ionizes the air about the tip, and a small faint purple jet of plasma can be seen in the dark on the conductive tip. Ionization of the nearby air molecule results in the generation of ionized air molecules having the same polarity as that of the charged tip. Subsequently, the tip repels the like-charged ion cloud, which immediately expands due to the repulsion between the ions themselves. This repulsion of ions creates an electric "wind" that emanates from the tip, usually accompanied by a hissing noise due to the change in air pressure at the tip. An opposite force acts on the tip that may recoil if not tight to the ground.

A vaneless ion wind generator performs the inverse function, using ambient wind to move ions, which are collected, yielding electrical energy.

== See also ==
- Air ioniser
- Ion thruster
- Ionocraft
- Plasma actuator
- Hall-effect thruster
- Magnetohydrodynamic drive
- Magnetoplasmadynamic thruster
- Pulsed inductive thruster
- Field-emission electric propulsion
- Spacecraft propulsion
