= Corona discharge =

Ionization of air around a high-voltage conductor

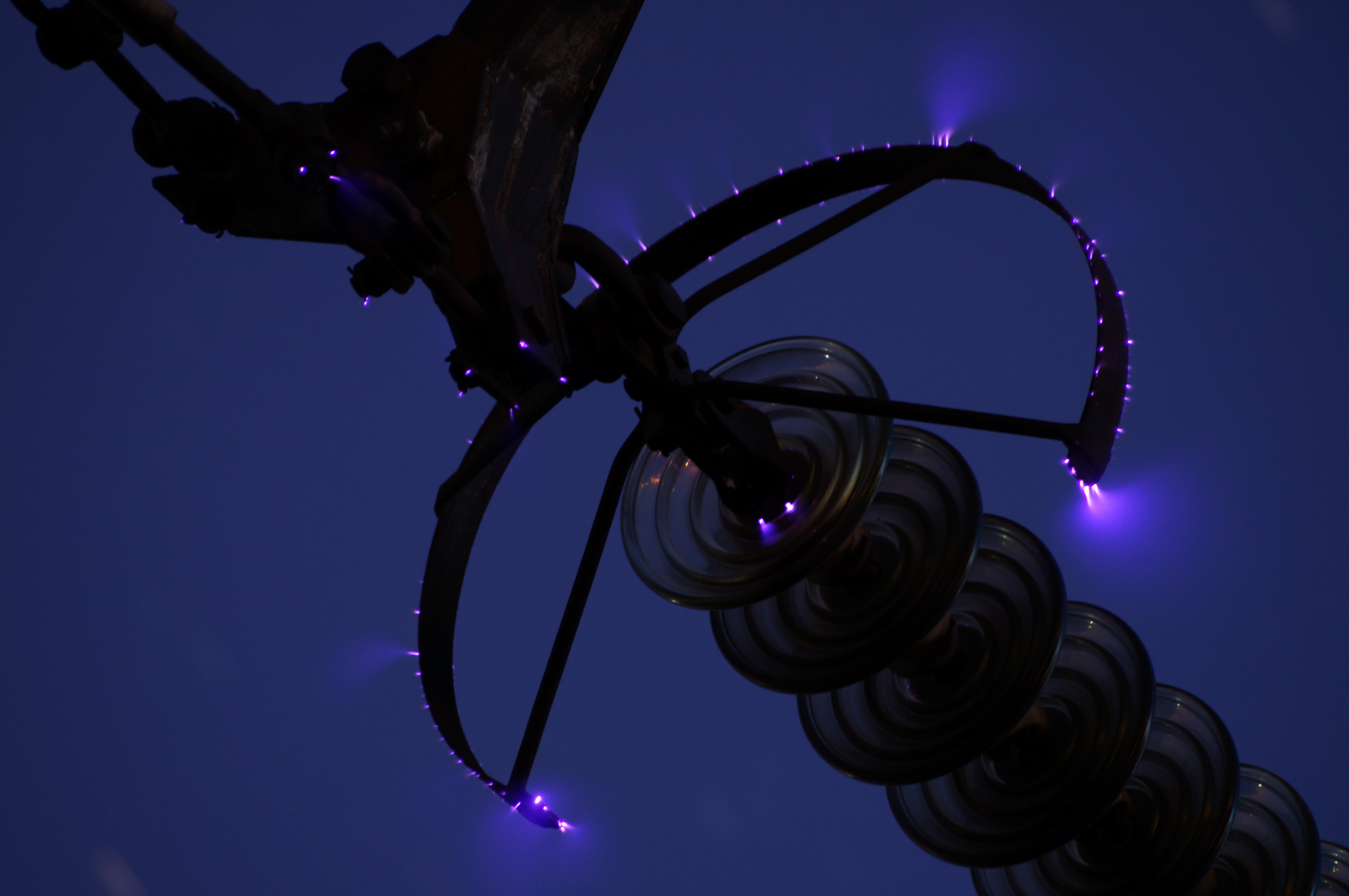
Long-exposure photograph of corona discharge on an insulator string of a 500 kV overhead power line. Corona discharges represent a significant power loss for electric utilities.

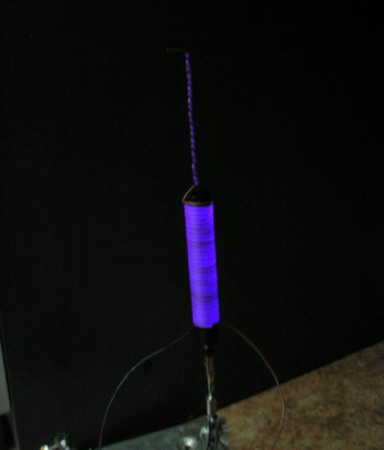
The corona discharge around a high-voltage coil

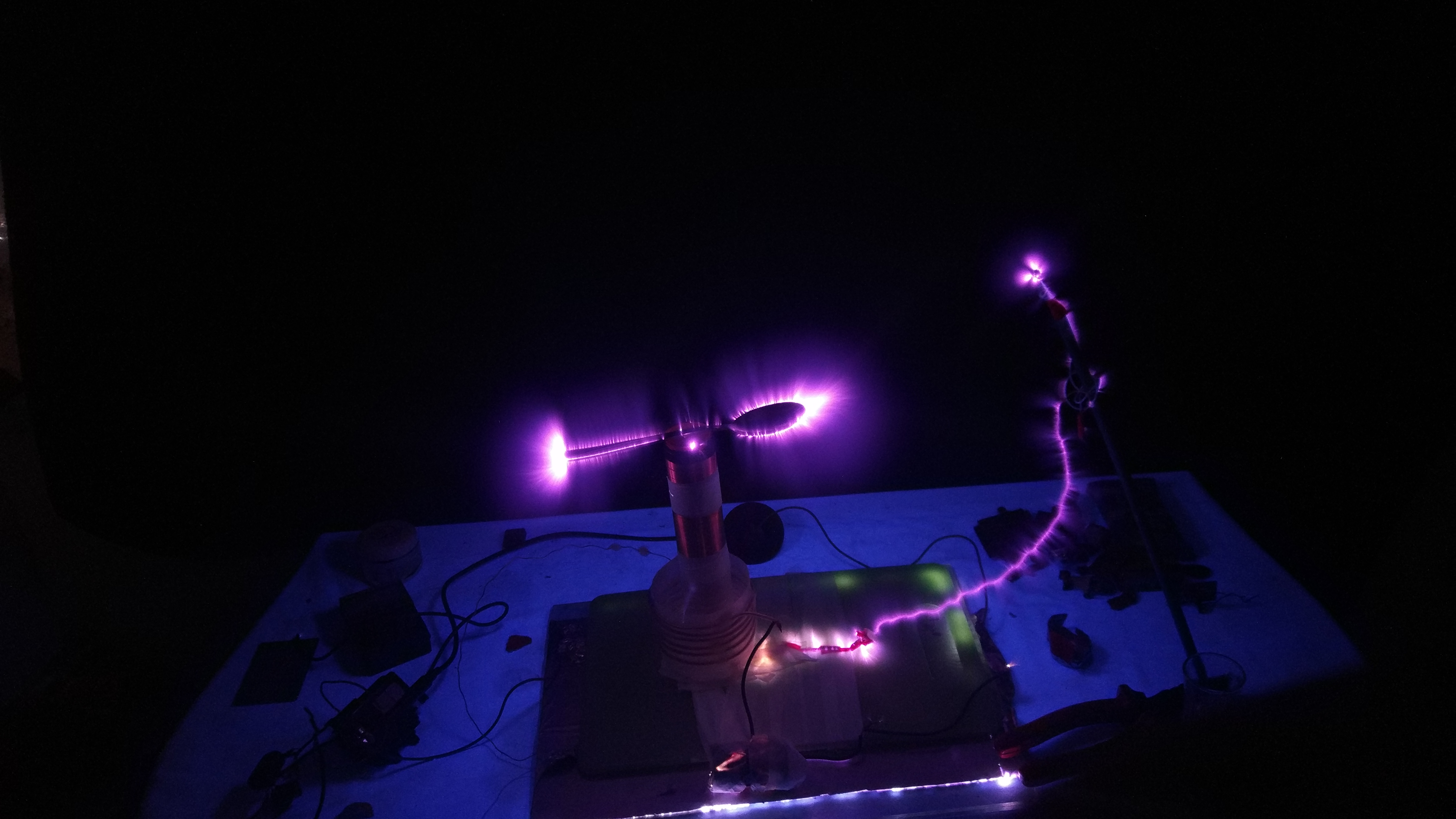
Corona discharge from a spoon attached to the high-voltage terminal of a Tesla coil

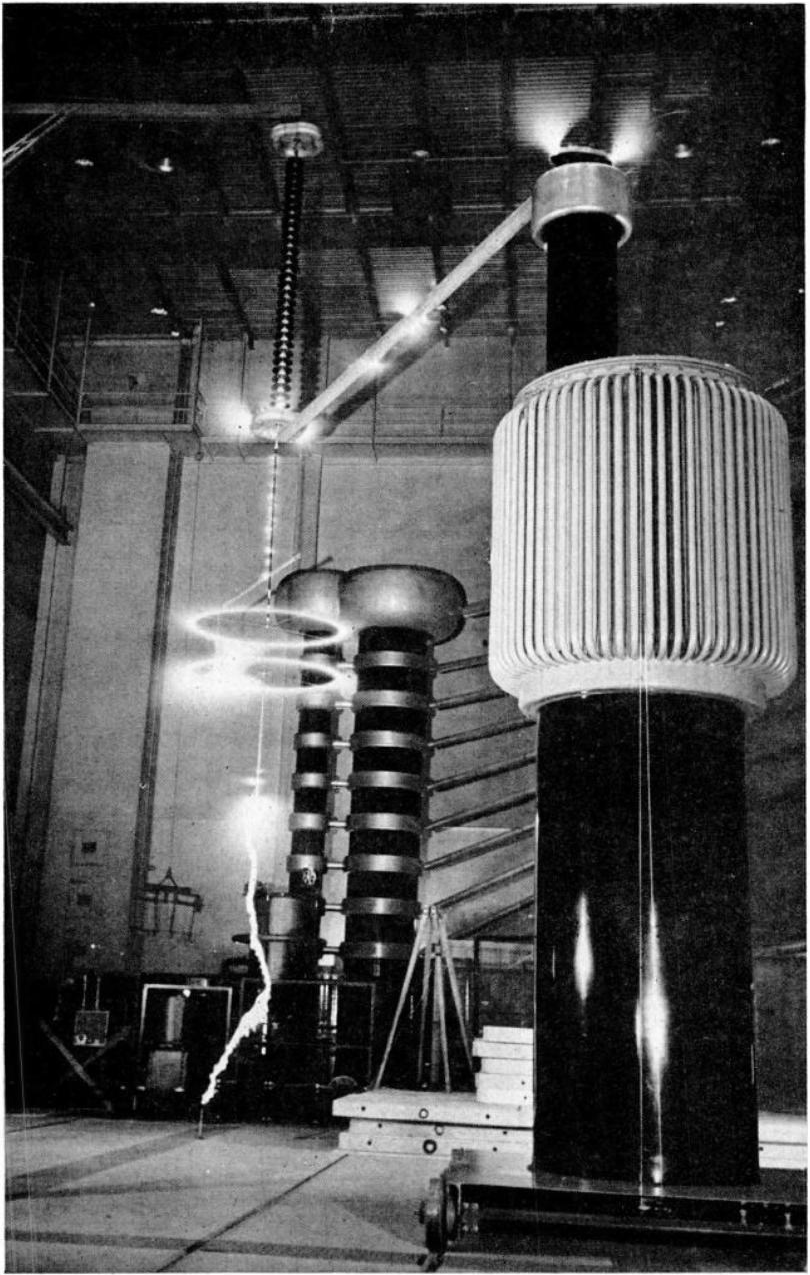
Large corona discharges (white) around conductors energized by a 1.05-million-volt transformer in a U.S. NIST laboratory in 1941

A corona discharge is an electrical discharge caused by ionizing a fluid, such as air, around a high-voltage conductor. The discharge occurs when the voltage exceeds a critical value that makes the makes fluid conductive but not enough for an electric arc to form; instead, it appears as a colored glow with branches.

A corona discharge occurs at locations where the electric field strength (potential gradient) around a conductor exceeds the dielectric strength of the air, producing an electrical breakdown and a bluish or magenta glow, emitting light by the same mechanism seen in gas discharge lamp and glow discharge, namely, via a combination of bremsstrahlung radiation and changes in electronic state that produce discrete spectral lines while leaking charges from the conductor due to the formed conductive space. Corona discharges can also happen in thunderstorms or other electrical weather, where objects like ship masts or airplane wings (see static wicks) form corona discharges due to the atmospheric electric field (see St. Elmo's fire) and friction or rubbing between airborne particles and the surface.

In many high-voltage applications, corona is an unwanted side effect. Corona discharge from high-voltage electric power transmission lines constitutes an economically significant waste of energy for utilities. In high-voltage equipment like cathode-ray-tube televisions, radio transmitters, X-ray machines, and particle accelerators, the current leakage caused by coronas can constitute an unwanted load on the circuit. In the air, coronas generate gases such as ozone (O_{3}) and nitric oxide (NO), and in turn form nitrogen dioxide (NO_{2}), and nitric acid (HNO_{3}) if water vapor is present. These gases are corrosive and can degrade and embrittle nearby materials, and are also toxic to humans and the environment.

Corona discharges can often be suppressed by improved insulation, corona rings, and making high-voltage electrodes in smooth rounded shapes.

Corona discharge can also be useful. Applications for controlled corona discharges include air filtration machines, photocopiers, and ozone generators.

== Introduction ==
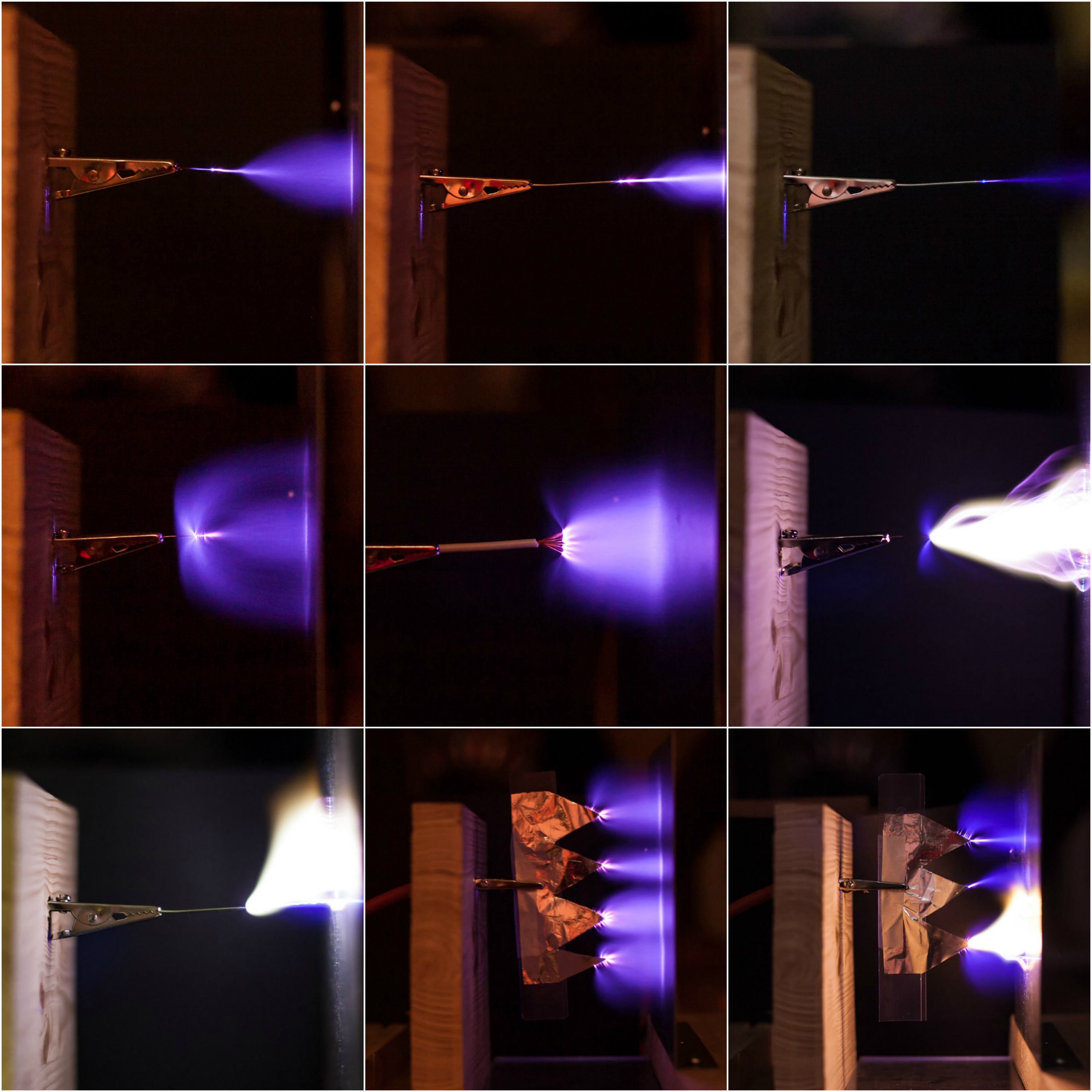
A variety of forms of corona discharge, from various metal objects. Notice, especially in the last two pictures, how the discharge is concentrated at the points on the objects.

A corona discharge occurs when current flows from a high-potential electrode into a neutral fluid, ionizing it to create a local plasma region (known as the active corona volume). This can increase the electrode's apparent size. The ions generated by the corona eventually pass the charge to nearby areas of lower potential, or recombine to form neutral molecules.

A corona discharge is commonly seen with electrodes or conductors with sharp points, edges, or small diameter wires because the electric field is strongest at those points. Because the conductive region is less sharp or small due to the electric field, conductor size, and resulting current, ionization may not extend beyond this local region. Outside this region, the charged particles slowly find their way to an oppositely charged object and are neutralized.

Along with the similar brush discharge, the corona is often called a "single-electrode discharge", as opposed to a "two-electrode discharge"—an electric arc. A corona forms only when the conductor is separated but not far enough for an arc to jump between them, with distance affecting the intensity and presence of the corona discharge. Suppose the geometry and gradient continue to grow. Thus, the ionized region will reach a nearby conductor and form a low-resistance conductive path between the two, resulting in an electric spark or electric arc (if the source continues to supply current), depending on what forms the electric field.

Corona discharge forms only when the electric field at the conductor's surface exceeds a critical value for the dielectric strength or disruptive potential gradient of the fluid to remain being an insulator. In air at sea level pressure of 101 kPa, the critical value is roughly 30 kV/cm, but this decreases with pressure and temperature; therefore, corona discharge become more intense and larger at higher elevation and temperatures, becoming more of a problem for aircraft and power lines. Corona discharge usually forms when the dielectric strength of the insulator is exceeded. However, sharp points, edges, and wires can easily trigger it by concentrating the electric field, causing discharge at lower values (around 2-6 kV) than 30 kV/cm. To suppress corona formation, terminals on high-voltage equipment are frequently designed with smooth, large-diameter, rounded shapes like balls or toruses to give the charges more space to spread out. Corona rings are often added to insulators of high-voltage transmission lines by distributing the electric field evenly.

Coronas may be positive or negative. This depends on the electric field or electrode's polarity. If an electrode is positive, it forms a positive corona; if the electrode is negative, it forms a negative corona. The physics between the two are significantly different. This asymmetry is a result of the greater difference in mass between the charges such as electrons and positive ions,along with inelastic collisions or changes in the velocity and energy of the charges.

An important reason to consider coronas is ozone production around conductors, with negative coronas generating much more ozone than positive coronas.

== Applications ==
Corona discharge has a number of commercial and industrial applications:

- Removal of unwanted electric charges from the surface of aircraft in flight and thus avoiding the detrimental effect of uncontrolled electrical discharge pulses on the performance of avionic systems
- Manufacture of ozone
- Sanitization of pool water
- In an electrostatic precipitator, removal of solid pollutants from a waste gas stream, or scrubbing particles from the air in air-conditioning systems
- Photocopying
- Air ionisers
- Production of photons for Kirlian photography to expose photographic film
- EHD thrusters, lifters, and other ionic wind devices
- Nitrogen laser
- Ionization of a gaseous sample for subsequent analysis in a mass spectrometer or an ion mobility spectrometer
- Static charge neutralization, as applied through antistatic devices like ionizing bars
- Refrigeration of electronic devices by forced convection

Coronas can be used to generate charged surfaces, which is an effect used in electrostatic copying (photocopying). They can also be used to remove particulate matter from air streams by first charging the air, and then passing the charged stream through a comb of alternating polarity, to deposit the charged particles onto oppositely charged plates.

The free radicals and ions generated in corona reactions can be used to scrub the air of certain noxious products, through chemical reactions, and can be used to produce ozone.

== Problems ==
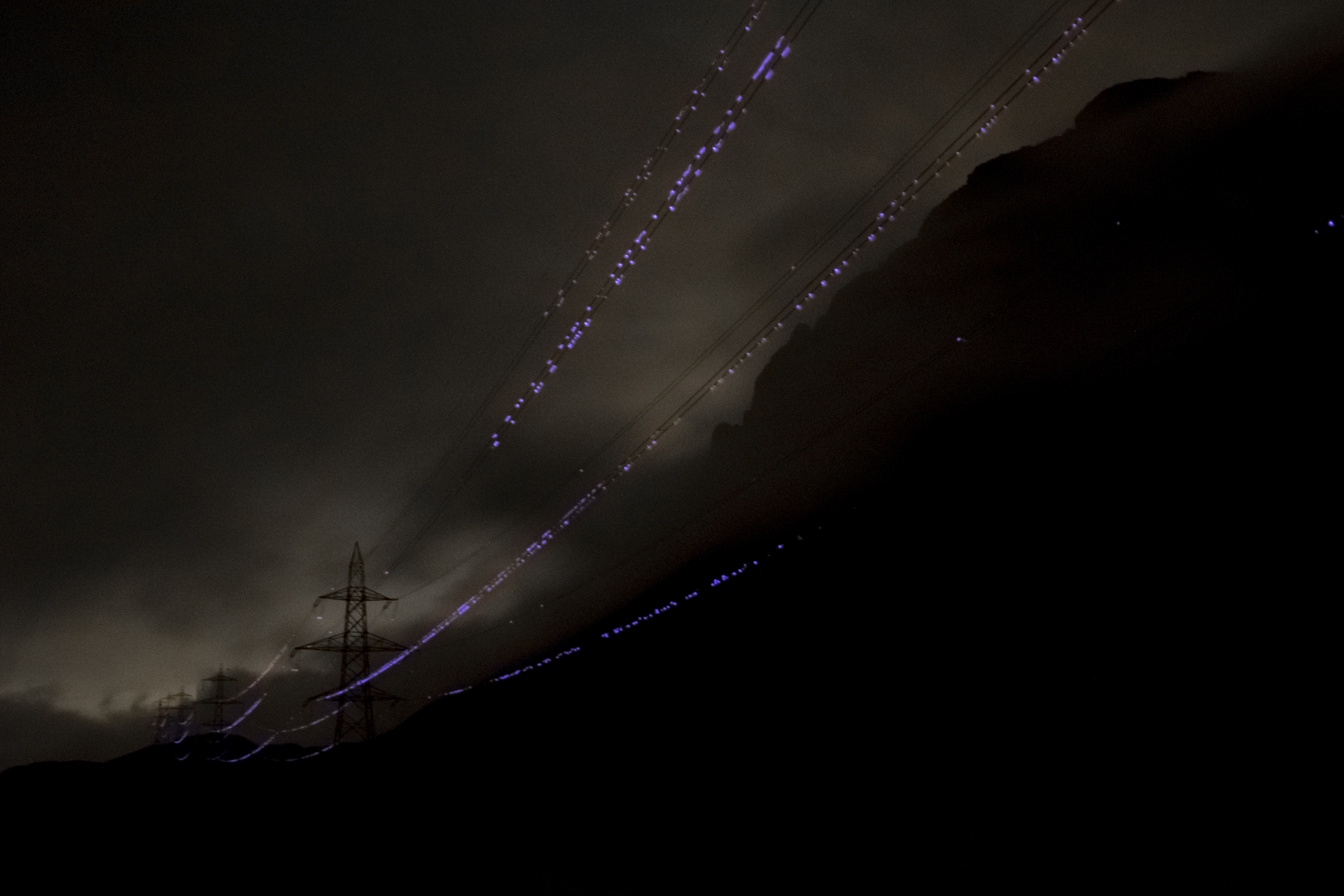
Corona discharges on the 380kV overhead power line over the Albula Pass (Switzerland) in foggy weather conditions (30 second long exposure)

Coronas can generate audible and radio-frequency noise, particularly near electric power transmission lines. Therefore, power transmission equipment is designed to minimize the formation of corona discharge.

Corona discharge is generally undesirable in:

- Electric power transmission, where it causes:
  - Power loss
  - Audible noise
  - Electromagnetic interference
  - Purple glow
  - Ozone production
  - Insulation damage
  - Possible distress in animals that are sensitive to ultraviolet light
- Electrical components such as transformers, capacitors, electric motors, and generators:
  - Corona can progressively damage the insulation inside these devices, leading to equipment failure.
  - Elastomer items such as O-rings can suffer ozone cracking.
  - Plastic film capacitors operating at mains voltage can suffer progressive loss of capacitance as corona discharges cause local vaporization of the metallization.

In many cases, corona rings and larger, smoother, globular electrodes can be added to suppress them.

== Mechanisms ==
Corona discharge occurs when the electric field is strong enough to ionize the air or another neutral fluid, causing charged particles and molecules, such as electrons, to gain enough speed and kinetic energy to collide with other atoms, ionize them, and produce more charged particles, which in turn do the same. The diagrams below illustrate, at a microscopic scale, the process that creates a corona in the air next to a pointed electrode held at a high negative voltage with respect to ground, producing a negative corona discharge (with an external source kicking it off or making the corona easier to form). The process goes as follows:

1. A neutral atom or molecule, in a region of the strong electric field (such as the high potential gradient near the discharge electrode), is enhanced by a natural environmental event (for example, being struck by an ultraviolet photon or cosmic ray particle) to create a positive ion and a free electron.
2. The electric field accelerates these oppositely charged particles in opposite directions, separating them, preventing recombination, and imparting kinetic energy to each.
3. Since electrons have a much higher charge-to-mass ratio, they accelerate to a higher velocity than the positive ion. It gains enough energy from the field that, when it strikes another atom, it ionizes it, knocking out another electron and creating another positive ion. These electrons accelerate and collide with other atoms, creating more electron/positive-ion pairs; these electrons then collide with more atoms in a chain reaction called an electron avalanche.
4. The corona's glow comes from electrons recombining with positive ions to form neutral atoms. When the electron falls back to its original energy level, it releases a photon of light. These photons serve to ionize other atoms, sustaining and expanding electron avalanches.
5. At a certain distance from the electrode, the electric field becomes too weak to impart enough energy to electrons to ionize atoms when they collide. This is the outer edge of the corona. Outside this, the ions move through the air without creating new ions. The outward-moving ions are attracted to the opposite electrode, eventually reach it, and combine with electrons from the electrode to become neutral atoms again, completing the circuit.

Both positive and negative coronas rely on electron avalanches. In a positive corona, electrons are attracted inward toward the positive electrode, and the positive ions are repelled outward. In a negative corona, the positive ions are attracted inward, and the electrons and negative ions are repelled outward. Thermodynamically, a corona is a highly nonequilibrium process that creates a non-thermal plasma because the avalanche mechanism does not release enough energy to heat the gas in the corona region, compared to an electric arc or spark. Only a small number of gas molecules take part in the electron avalanches and are ionized, with energies close to the ionization energy of 1–3 ev, the rest of the surrounding gas remains near ambient temperature.

The onset voltage of corona or corona inception voltage (CIV) can be found with Peek's law (1929), formulated from empirical observations. Later papers derived more accurate formulas.

== Differences between positive and negative corona discharges ==
=== Positive coronas ===
==== Properties ====
A positive corona is usually thinner and more uniform than a negative corona, and matches the dimensions of the glow or ionization region. At lower values or when the corona discharge is stable (depending on environmental, electrode, and gap conditions), the positive corona starts as a glow; at increasingly higher values or voltages, the positive corona transitions into a streamer regime, with small and singular to dozens of larger streamers before a spark or arc occurs between the electrodes.A positive corona produces less ozone than a negative corona due to differences in electron quantity (being significantly smaller) and their reactions from impact and cascade events. This is accompanied by lower corona current due to the slow ionic movement, whereas negative corona discharges have higher corona currents.However, they are more severe due to greater amplitude and lower repetition rates, leading to greater electromagnetic interference and audible noise.Positive ions form closer and are repelled slowly compared to electrons due to their mass towards the opposing conductor, with electrons more active in the high field region around the positive electrode, making them have more energy compared to a negative corona discharge.

Therefore, if electrons are used in an application that requires high activation energy, positive coronas may support a greater reaction constant than corresponding negative coronas; though total number of electrons may be lower, the number of very high-energy electrons may be higher.

==== Mechanisms ====
A positive corona, as in with negative corona discharge example the example above, is initiated by an exogenous ionization event in a region of a high potential gradient. The electrons produced by the ionization events are attracted toward the discharge electrode, and the positive ions repelled from it. By undergoing inelastic collisions closer and closer to the discharge electrode, they ionize more molecules in an electron avalanche.

In a positive corona, secondary electrons that drive further avalanches are generated predominantly in the fluid itself, outside the plasma or avalanche region. They are created by the photoelectric effect,where extreme ultraviolet photons or high-energy photons are emitted from that plasma in the various de-excitation processes occurring within the plasma after the electron collisions; the thermal energy liberated in those collisions creating photons that radiate into the gas. The electrons resulting from the ionization of a neutral gas molecule are then attracted to the positive electrode, further causing new electron avalanches, and so begins the process of creating further avalanches inside the plasma or sustaining ionization region.

=== Negative coronas ===
==== Properties ====
A negative corona usually forms a thicker or brighter plasma region because more impact ionization events occur and more free electrons are present than in a positive corona. While the ionization regions tends to remain close to the electrode, the glow expands farther but non-uniform or irregular compared to a positive corona because of electron drift.However, the corona generates fewer energetic electrons than the positive corona and thus show a reversal: positive coronas have fewer electrons but more energetic ones; negative coronas have more electrons but less energetic ones. Therefore, while increased electron density increases the reaction rate, lower electron energy means reactions which require higher electron energy may take place at a lower rate. When the discharge electrode is energized, the negative corona discharge appears with a Trichel pulse (pulsations of the discharge depending on the current supplying the electrode), followed by non-pulsed streamer regimes and finally a spark or arc when the insulated gap between the electrodes or a conductive object breaks down.

==== Mechanisms ====
Negative coronas function similarly to positive coronas but have drastically different ionization and discharge characteristics because electrons dominate and have less mass than positive ions. As with the positive corona, a corona begins with an exogenous ionization event that generates a primary electron, followed by an electron avalanche. The free electrons from the electrode and fluid molecules are pushed away from the electrode while impacting with other molecules, generating even more avalanches to form electron-positive ions pairs that move into opposite directions to prevent recombination, along with formation of negative ions within the weak field or drift region when they attach to other molecules, such as oxygen molecules in air. The photoelectric effect further contributes to electron detachment and increases electron quantity. The work function of the electrons (the energy required to free them from the surface) is considerably lower than the ionization energy of air at standard temperatures and pressures, making it a more liberal source of secondary electrons under these conditions. In a negative corona, the high concentration of positive ions clustering around the discharge electrode further diminishes the use of ionized neutral gas as an ionization source.

The difference between positive and negative coronas, in terms of generating secondary electron avalanches and their starting direction, is that in a positive corona, they form in the fluid surrounding the plasma region, with the new secondary electrons traveling inward. In contrast, in a negative corona, the electrode itself forms the new secondary electrons, which then travel outward.

A further feature of the structure of negative coronas is that, as the electrons drift outwards, they encounter neutral molecules and, with electronegative molecules (such as oxygen and water vapor), combine to produce the aforementioned negative ions. These negative ions are then attracted to the positive, larger electrode, completing the 'circuit'.

== Electrical wind ==
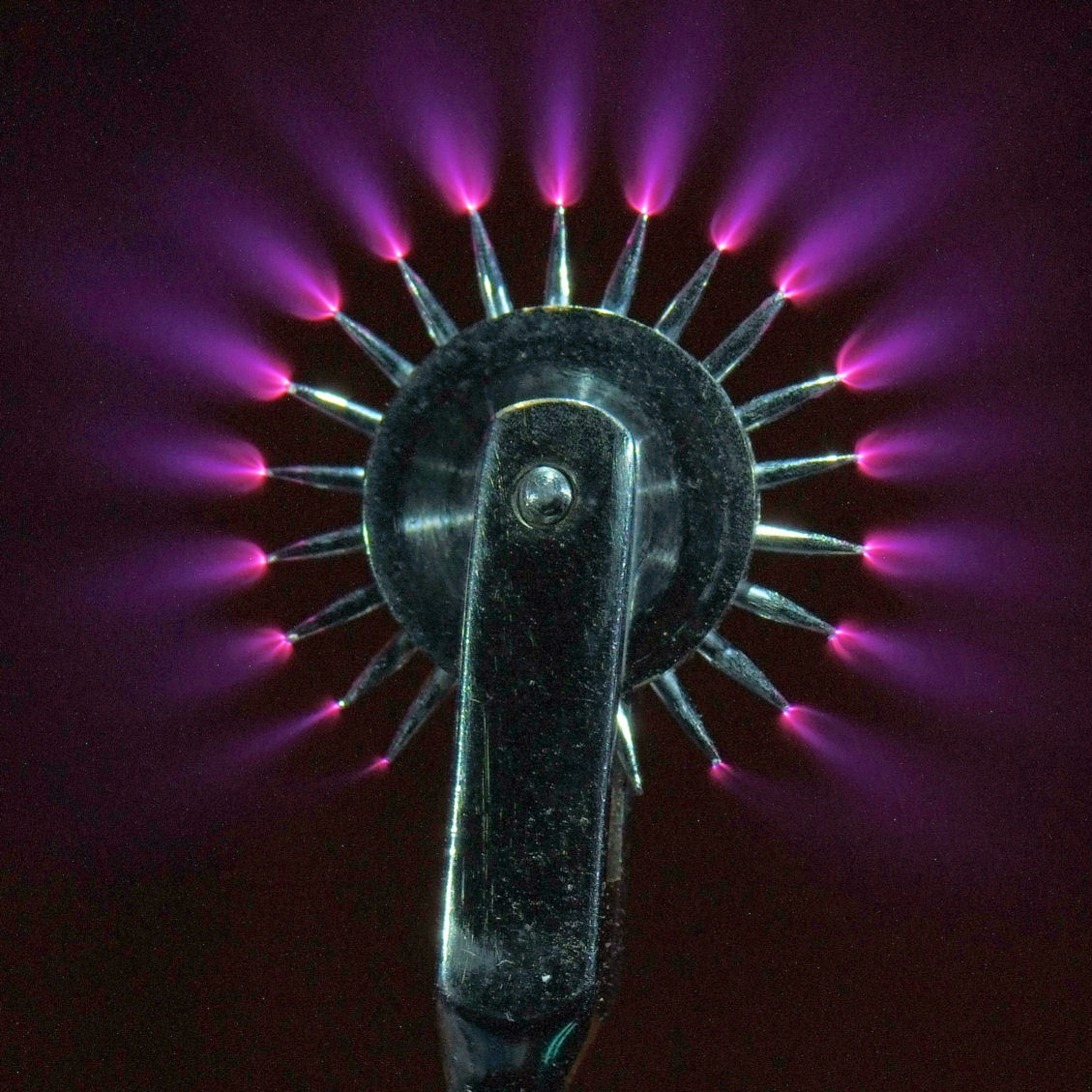
Corona discharge on a Wartenberg wheel

Ionized gases produced in a corona discharge are accelerated by the electric field, producing a gas flow, or electrical wind. The air movement associated with a discharge current of a few hundred microamperes can blow out a small candle flame within about 1 cm of a discharge point. A pinwheel with radial metal spokes and pointed tips bent to point along the circumference of a circle can rotate when energized by a corona discharge; the rotation results from differential electric attraction between the metal spokes and the space charge shield region surrounding the tips.As seen with positive and negative corona discharges, the produced electrical wind has varying characteristics: positive coronas produce a sharper, more pointed, and faster jet flow with a smaller active area, while negative coronas produce a jet that is wider, slower, and more diffused with a larger active area. The flow flow appears to be mainly determined by the Trichel pulses and breakdown streamers.

== See also ==
- Alternating current
- Atmospheric pressure chemical ionization
- Crookes tube
- Dielectric barrier discharge
- Kirlian photography
- St. Elmo's fire
