= Index of physics articles (S) =

The index of physics articles is split into multiple pages due to its size.

To navigate by individual letter use the table of contents below.

== S ==
- S-1 Uranium Committee
- S-LINK
- S-PRISM
- S-brane
- S-duality
- S-knot
- S-matrix
- S-matrix theory
- S-process
- S-wave
- S. Brooks McLane
- S. Pancharatnam
- SAFARI-1
- SAGE (Soviet–American Gallium Experiment)
- SAM1
- SAM 935
- SAT Subject Test in Physics
- SDSSJ0946+1006
- SDSS J0927+2943
- SED Systems
- SELFOC Microlens
- SETAR (model)
- SHEEP (symbolic computation system)
- SIESTA (computer program)
- SIMP
- SIMPLE (dark matter)
- SIMPLE algorithm
- SINDO
- SI electromagnetism units
- SLAC
- SLAC (disambiguation)
- SLAC National Accelerator Laboratory
- SLOWPOKE reactor
- SMART-1
- SNO+
- SNOLAB
- SNUPPS
- SN 1006
- SN 1987A
- SN 2002cx
- SN 2003fg
- SN 2005gj
- SN 2007bi
- SO(10) (physics)
- SOFAR channel
- SOLEIL
- SPEAR
- SPEED2000
- SPIE
- SPIN bibliographic database
- SPring-8
- SQUID
- SS Charles H. Cugle
- STACEE
- STAR detector
- STAR model
- STATCOM
- STEP (satellite)
- SU(5)
- SUNIST
- SUVAT equations
- SWEEPNIK
- SYZ conjecture
- S band
- Sabba S. Ştefănescu
- Sabin (unit)
- Sacharias Jansen
- Sachs–Wolfe effect
- Sackur–Tetrode equation
- Safety of particle collisions at the Large Hadron Collider
- Saffir–Simpson Hurricane Scale
- Sagitta (optics)
- Sagnac effect
- Saha ionization equation
- Sailing faster than the wind
- Saint-Laurent-des-Eaux
- Saint Anthony Falls Laboratory
- Sajeev John
- Sakurai Prize
- Sally Ride
- Salomon Kalischer
- Salter's duck
- Sam Edwards (physicist)
- Sam Treiman
- Samar Mubarakmand
- Samarium–cobalt magnet
- Sameera Moussa
- Samson Kutateladze
- Samuel C. C. Ting
- Samuel Collins (physicist)
- Samuel Curran
- Samuel Devons
- Samuel E. Blum
- Samuel Goudsmit
- Samuel Jackson Barnett
- Samuel King Allison
- Samuel L. Braunstein
- Samuel Milner
- Samuel T. Cohen
- Samuel T. Durrance
- Samuel Tolansky
- Samuel Tolver Preston
- Sandip Chakrabarti
- Sandip Trivedi
- Sankar Das Sarma
- Sarah Frances Whiting
- Sarfus
- Saskatchewan Accelerator Laboratory
- Saskatoon experiment
- Satellite flare
- Satellite laser ranging
- Satish Dhawan
- Satoshi Kawata
- Satosi Watanabe
- Saturable absorption
- Saturation (magnetic)
- Saturation vapor curve
- Saturation vapor pressure
- Satyendra Nath Bose
- Sauerbrey equation
- Saul Dushman
- Saul Perlmutter
- Saul Rappaport
- Saul Teukolsky
- Sauter mean diameter
- Savart wheel
- Savas Dimopoulos
- Savonius wind turbine
- Saybolt universal second
- Scalar–tensor theory
- Scalar–vector–tensor decomposition
- Scalar (physics)
- Scalar Field Dark Matter
- Scalar boson
- Scalar electrodynamics
- Scalar field (quantum field theory)
- Scalar field dark matter
- Scalar field solution
- Scalar field theory
- Scalar meson
- Scalar multiplication
- Scalar potential
- Scalar theories of gravitation
- Scalar–tensor–vector gravity
- Scale-free ideal gas
- Scale factor (cosmology)
- Scale invariance
- Scale relativity
- Scaling limit
- Scanning Acoustic Tomography
- Scanning SQUID microscope
- Scanning acoustic microscope
- Scanning capacitance microscopy
- Scanning probe microscopy
- Scanning transmission electron microscopy
- Scanning tunneling microscope
- Scattering
- Scattering-matrix method
- Scattering (optics)
- Scattering channel
- Scattering cross-section
- Scattering from rough surfaces
- Scattering length
- Scattering rate
- Scattering theory
- Sceptre (fusion reactor)
- Schaefer–Bergmann diffraction
- Scharnhorst effect
- Scherk–Schwarz mechanism
- Schiehallion experiment
- Schlieren
- Schlieren imaging
- Schlieren photography
- Schmidt corrector plate
- Schmidt number
- School of Physics and Astronomy, University of Manchester
- Schottky anomaly
- Schottky defect
- Schrödinger's Kittens and the Search for Reality
- Schrödinger's cat
- Schrödinger's cat in popular culture
- Schrödinger equation
- Schrödinger picture
- Schrödinger–Newton equation
- Schumann resonances
- Schuyler Wheeler
- Schwarzschild coordinates
- Schwarzschild criterion
- Schwarzschild geodesics
- Schwarzschild metric
- Schwarzschild radius
- Schwinger's quantum action principle
- Schwinger function
- Schwinger limit
- Schwinger model
- Schwinger parametrization
- Schwinger–Dyson equation
- Schön scandal
- SciBooNE
- Science Abstracts
- Science and Technology of Advanced Materials
- Scientific equipment optician
- Scintillation (physics)
- Scintillation counter
- Scintillator
- Scleronomous
- Scott Anderson (physicist)
- Scott Diddams
- Scott Forbush
- Screened Poisson equation
- Screw (motion)
- Screw axis
- Screw pump
- Screw theory
- Scripta Materialia
- Sea breeze
- Sea state
- Sean Cadogan
- Sean M. Carroll
- Search for the Higgs boson
- Searle's bar method
- Sears–Haack body
- Seashell resonance
- Sebastian Doniach
- Sebastian Seung
- Sebastian von Hoerner
- Second-harmonic generation
- Second-order fluid
- Second-order transition
- Second Industrial Revolution
- Second class constraints
- Second law of thermodynamics
- Second moment of area
- Second sound
- Second superstring revolution
- Secondary circulation
- Secondary electrons
- Secondary emission
- Secondary flow
- Secondary ion mass spectrometry
- Secondary mirror
- Sectional density
- Sector instrument
- Secular equilibrium
- Sedan (nuclear test)
- Sediment transport
- Sedimentation
- Seed crystal
- Seed nucleus
- Seeding (fluid dynamics)
- Seesaw mechanism
- Segre classification
- Segré–Silberberg effect
- Seiberg duality
- Seiberg–Witten gauge theory
- Seibert Q. Duntley
- Seiche
- Seifallah Randjbar-Daemi
- Seismic metamaterials
- Seismic migration
- Seismic refraction
- Seismic source
- Seismic tomography
- Seismological Society of America
- Selected-ion flow-tube mass spectrometry
- Selected area diffraction
- Selection rule
- Selective adsorption
- Selective surface
- Self-amplified stimulated emission
- Self-averaging
- Self-diffusion
- Self-energy
- Self-focusing transducers
- Self-information
- Self-interacting dark matter
- Self-mixing interferometry
- Self-organized criticality
- Self-phase modulation
- Self-propagating high-temperature synthesis
- Sellafield
- Sellmeier equation
- Semi-empirical mass formula
- Semi-empirical quantum chemistry method
- Semi-major axis
- Semi-minor axis
- Semi-rigid airship
- Semiclassical gravity
- Semiconductor
- Semiconductor Science and Technology
- Semiconductor characterization techniques
- Semiconductor detector
- Semiconductor fault diagnostics
- Semiconductor ring laser
- Semileptonic decay
- Semimetal
- Semipermeable membrane
- Sendai Nuclear Power Plant
- Sending loudness rating
- Sendust
- Sensible heat
- Separable state
- Separatrix (dynamical systems)
- Sequential structure alignment program
- Sequential walking
- Serge Haroche
- Serge Rudaz
- Serge Timashev
- Sergei Alexander Schelkunoff
- Sergei Gukov
- Sergei K. Godunov
- Sergei Kopeikin
- Sergei Kovalev
- Sergei Odintsov
- Sergei P. Kurdyumov
- Sergei Tyablikov
- Sergei Vonsovsky
- Sergey Chaplygin
- Sergey Ivanovich Vavilov
- Sergey Kapitsa
- Sergey Khristianovich
- Sergey M. Bezrukov
- Sergey Nikitin (musician)
- Sergio Ferrara
- Sergiu Rădăuţan
- Serguei Krasnikov
- Set and drift
- Seth Neddermeyer
- Severn Barrage
- Sextupole magnet
- Seymour Benzer
- Sfermion
- Sgoldstino
- Shade (shadow)
- Shadowgraph
- Shadows of the Mind
- Shahn Majid
- Shahriar Afshar
- Shake (unit)
- Shakedown (continuum mechanics)
- Shallow donor
- Shallow water equations
- Shamal (wind)
- Shamit Kachru
- Shanghai Synchrotron Radiation Facility
- Shannon Walker
- Shape factor (X-ray diffraction)
- Shape factor (boundary layer flow)
- Shape of the universe
- Shape resonance
- Shape waves
- Shapiro delay
- Sharkovskii's theorem
- Shashlik (physics)
- Shaukat Hameed Khan
- Shawn Carlson
- Shear flow
- Shear modulus
- Shear rate
- Shear strain
- Shear stress
- Shear thinning
- Shear velocity
- Shearing (physics)
- Shearography
- Shed (unit)
- Sheer thinning
- Sheldon Datz
- Sheldon Glashow
- Shell balance
- Shell theorem
- Shelter Island Conference
- Shen Chun-shan
- Shengwang Du
- Sherwood number
- Shielding effect
- Shields parameter
- Shigeo Satomura
- Shijun Liao
- Shim (magnetism)
- Shin'ichi Nojiri
- Shing-Tung Yau
- Shinzo Shinjo
- Ship tracks
- Shiraz Minwalla
- Shirley Ann Jackson
- Shirshov Institute of Oceanology
- Shiva laser
- Shiyi Chen
- Shkarofsky function
- Shlomo Havlin
- Shock (fluid dynamics)
- Shock (mechanics)
- Shock capturing methods
- Shock diamond
- Shock metamorphism
- Shock stall
- Shock tube
- Shock wave
- Shock waves in astrophysics
- Shockley–Queisser limit
- Shoe-fitting fluoroscope
- Shoichi Sakata
- Shor's algorithm
- Shortcut model
- Shortwave radiation
- Shot noise
- Shower-curtain effect
- Shri Krishna Joshi
- Shubnikov–de Haas effect
- Shunt impedance
- Side-scan sonar
- Sidereus Nuncius
- Sideslip angle
- Sidney Altman
- Sidney Coleman
- Sidney Dancoff
- Sidney Drell
- Sidney R. Nagel
- Sidney Redner
- Siegbahn notation
- Siegfried Czapski
- Siegfried Flügge
- Siegfried Hecker
- Siemens (unit)
- Siemens cycle
- Siemens star
- Sievert
- Sievert chamber
- Sievert integral
- Sigma Pi Sigma
- Sigma baryon
- Sigma model
- Sign convention
- Signal-to-noise plus interference
- Signal-to-noise ratio
- Signal beam
- Signal velocity
- Signature change
- Significant wave height
- Signorini problem
- Sigurd Hofmann
- Sigurd Zienau
- Silas D. Alben
- Silent Aircraft Initiative
- Silex
- Silex Process
- Silicon-germanium
- Silicon (journal)
- Silicon bandgap temperature sensor
- Silicon photomultiplier
- Silicon photonics
- Silicon transistor
- Silly Putty
- Silver nanoparticles
- Silvo Breskvar
- Simon Ostrach
- Simon Ramo
- Simon Shnoll
- Simon van der Meer
- Simons Center for Geometry and Physics
- Simple harmonic motion
- Simple harmonic oscillator
- Simple lens
- Simple machine
- Simple shear
- Simplex noise
- Simulated fluorescence process algorithm
- Simulated reality
- Simulation hypothesis
- Simultaneous masking
- Siméon Denis Poisson
- Sin-Itiro Tomonaga
- Sine–Gordon equation
- Singing arc
- Singing sand
- Single-molecule magnet
- Single-particle spectrum
- Single-photon emission computed tomography
- Single crystal
- Single domain (magnetic)
- Single negative metamaterial
- Single scattering albedo
- Single wavelength anomalous dispersion
- Singlet state
- Singleton field
- Singular isothermal sphere profile
- Singularity (Bill DeSmedt novel)
- Sinusoidal plane-wave solutions of the electromagnetic wave equation
- Sinyan Shen
- Siphon
- Sir Andrew Noble, 1st Baronet
- Sir George Stokes, 1st Baronet
- Sir James Hall, 4th Baronet
- Sisir Kumar Mitra
- Sisyphus cooling
- Sisyphus effect
- Sivaramakrishna Chandrasekhar
- Six's thermometer
- Skew-T log-P diagram
- Skin depth
- Skin effect
- Skip distance
- Skip reentry
- Sky Polarization Observatory
- Sky anchor
- Sky brightness
- Skyrmion
- Slack water
- Slater-type orbital
- Slater determinant
- Slater integrals
- Slave boson
- Slavnov–Taylor identities
- Slender-body theory
- Sliding (motion)
- Sliding friction
- Slip (materials science)
- Slip (vehicle dynamics)
- Slip melting point
- Slipstream
- Slit experiment
- Sloan Digital Sky Survey
- Sloan Extension for Galactic Understanding and Exploration 2
- Slope efficiency
- Slosh dynamics
- Slow-motion approximation
- Slow light
- Slowly varying envelope approximation
- Small-angle X-ray scattering
- Small-angle neutron scattering
- Small-angle scattering
- Small Tight Aspect Ratio Tokamak
- Small article monitor
- Small wind turbine
- Smart Fluids
- Smart Materials and Structures
- Smart fluid
- Smart glass
- Smart material
- Smithsonian Astrophysical Observatory
- Smith–Purcell effect
- Smoke
- Smoke ring
- Smoluchowski coagulation equation
- Smooth camber change
- Smoothed-particle hydrodynamics
- Smuon
- Smyth Report
- Snap freezing
- Snell's law
- Sneutrino
- Soap bubble
- Society of Exploration Geophysicists
- Society of Physics Students
- Sod shock tube
- Sodium Reactor Experiment
- Soft-collinear effective theory
- Soft Matter (journal)
- Soft SUSY breaking
- Soft X-ray emission spectroscopy
- Soft matter
- Soft photons
- Soft radiation
- Softening
- Soil physics
- Soil plant atmosphere continuum
- Soil thermal properties
- Sokolov–Ternov effect
- Solar cosmic ray
- Solar energetic particles
- Solar energy
- Solar flare
- Solar magnetogram
- Solar mass
- Solar neutrino
- Solar neutrino problem
- Solar neutrino unit
- Solar Observing Optical Network
- Solar System model
- Solar physicist
- Solar physics
- Solar Physics (journal)
- Solar prominence
- Solar radiation pressure
- Solar thermal energy
- Solar wind
- Solarization (physics)
- Solarsoft
- Solenoid
- Solenoidal vector field
- Solid
- Solid-state ionics
- Solid-state laser
- Solid-state nuclear magnetic resonance
- Solid-state nuclear track detector
- Solid-state physics
- Solid State Communications
- Solid angle
- Solid harmonics
- Solid hydrogen
- Solid mechanics
- Solid solution
- Solid state dye lasers
- Solidus (chemistry)
- Soliton
- Soliton (optics)
- Solomon Saltiel
- Solstice
- Solution of Schrödinger equation for a step potential
- Solutions of the Einstein field equations
- Solvated electron
- Solvay Conference
- Solving the geodesic equations
- Somerset Space Walk
- Sommerfeld identity
- Sommerfeld number
- Sommerfeld radiation condition
- Sommerfeld–Kossel displacement law
- Somnath Bharadwaj
- Sonar
- Sondrestrom Upper Atmospheric Research Facility
- Sone
- Sonic black hole
- Sonic boom
- Sonic cavitation
- Sonic weapon
- Sonication
- Sonobuoy
- Sonochemistry
- Sonology
- Sonoluminescence
- Soret Peak
- Sorption
- Sorptivity
- Soudan 1
- Soudan 2
- Sound
- Sound Retrieval System
- Sound amplification by stimulated emission of radiation
- Sound baffle
- Sound barrier
- Sound diffuser
- Sound energy density
- Sound energy flux
- Sound from ultrasound
- Sound generator
- Sound intensity
- Sound intensity level
- Sound of fingernails scraping chalkboard
- Sound power
- Sound power level
- Sound pressure
- Sound reduction index
- Sound transmission class
- Source counts
- Source field
- Source function
- Southern Hemisphere Auroral Radar Experiment
- Soviet Physics Uspekhi
- Sołtan argument
- Space
- Space Weather Prediction Center
- Space charge
- Space group
- Space physics
- Spacequake
- Spaceship Earth (detector)
- Spacetime
- Spacetime algebra
- Spacetime symmetries
- Spacetime topology
- Spaghettification
- Spalart–Allmaras turbulence model
- Spallation
- Spallation Neutron Source
- Spark (fire)
- Spark chamber
- Spark gap
- Sparticle
- Spaser
- Spatial cutoff frequency
- Spatial filter
- Spatial frequency
- Spatial twist continuum
- Special nuclear material
- Special relativity
- Special relativity (alternative formulations)
- Special sciences
- Special sensor microwave/imager
- Specific absorption rate
- Specific activity
- Specific detectivity
- Specific energy
- Specific force
- Specific gravity
- Specific impulse
- Specific kinetic energy
- Specific latent heat of fusion
- Specific orbital energy
- Specific radiative intensity
- Specific relative angular momentum
- Specific speed
- Specific strength
- Specific volume
- Specific weight
- Speckle noise
- Speckle pattern
- Spectral bands
- Spectral density
- Spectral imaging
- Spectral line
- Spectral mutability
- Spectral phase interferometry for direct electric-field reconstruction
- Spectral splatter
- Spectral triple
- Spectrogram
- Spectrograph
- Spectroradiometer
- Spectroscopic notation
- Spectroscopy
- Specular reflection
- Speed
- Speed of electricity
- Speed of gravity
- Speed of light
- Speed of revolution
- Speed of sound
- Spekkens Toy Model
- Spencer R. Weart
- Spent nuclear fuel
- Spenta R. Wadia
- Sphaleron
- Sphere of influence (astrodynamics)
- Sphere packing
- Spherical aberration
- Spherical cow
- Spherical harmonics
- Spherical model
- Spherical multipole moments
- Spherical tokamak
- Spherically symmetric spacetime
- Spheromak
- Spider (polarimeter)
- Spin-destruction collision
- Spin-flip
- Spin-orbital
- Spin-polarized electron energy loss spectroscopy
- Spin-stabilized magnetic levitation
- Spin-statistics theorem
- Spin-weighted spherical harmonics
- Spin-½
- Spin (physics)
- Spin Hall effect
- Spin Liquid
- Spin angular momentum of light
- Spin chemistry
- Spin connection
- Spin crossover
- Spin density wave
- Spin diffusion
- Spin echo
- Spin foam
- Spin glass
- Spin ice
- Spin isomers of hydrogen
- Spin magnetic moment
- Spin model
- Spin multiplicity
- Spin network
- Spin polarization
- Spin probe
- Spin pumping
- Spin quantum number
- Spin states (d electrons)
- Spin stiffness
- Spin tensor
- Spin transistor
- Spin valve
- Spin wave
- Spinhenge@Home
- Spinodal decomposition
- Spinon
- Spinor
- Spinor bundle
- Spinoza Prize
- Spinplasmonics
- Spinthariscope
- Spintronics
- Spin–charge separation
- Spin–orbit interaction
- Spiral computed tomography
- Spiral divergence
- Spiru Haret
- Splash (fluid mechanics)
- Split-Hopkinson pressure bar
- Split-quaternion
- Split-ring resonator
- Split supersymmetry
- Spoiler (aeronautics)
- Spontaneous emission
- Spontaneous fission
- Spontaneous magnetization
- Spontaneous parametric down-conversion
- Spontaneous process
- Spontaneous symmetry breaking
- Sporadic E propagation
- Spouting can
- Spray nozzle
- Spring pendulum
- Spring scale
- Springboard
- Sputtering
- Squall
- Square-lattice Ising model
- Square metre
- Squashed entanglement
- Squat effect
- Squeeze operator
- Squeezed coherent state
- Srnoluchowski
- Stabilator
- Stability derivatives
- Stable map
- Stack effect
- Staebler–Wronski effect
- Staggered fermion
- Stagnation point
- Stagnation pressure
- Stagnation temperature
- Stall (flight)
- Stall delay
- Stall strips
- Stan Frankel
- Standard-Model Extension
- Standard Dry Air
- Standard Model
- Standard Model (mathematical formulation)
- Standard conditions for temperature and pressure
- Standard cubic feet per minute
- Standard day
- Standard enthalpy of formation
- Standard enthalpy of reaction
- Standard gravitational parameter
- Standard linear solid model
- Standard molar entropy
- Standard ruler
- Standard solar model
- Standing wave
- Stanford E. Woosley
- Stanford Institute for Theoretical Physics
- Stanford Large Detector
- Stanford Linear Collider
- Stanford Physics Information Retrieval System
- Stanford Synchrotron Radiation Lightsource
- Stanhope lens
- Stanislas Sorel
- Stanislav Mikheyev
- Stanisław Mrozowski
- Stanley Autler
- Stanley Brodsky
- Stanley Deser
- Stanley G. Love
- Stanley Mandelstam
- Stanley S. Ballard
- Stanley Schmidt
- Stanley Whitehead (physicist)
- Stanton T. Friedman
- Star
- Star formation
- Stark effect
- Stark spectroscopy
- Stark spectroscopy (physics)
- Stark–Einstein law
- Starling equation
- Starting vortex
- Startup winding
- State-of-the-Art Reactor Consequence Analyses
- State-universal coupled cluster
- State of matter
- Static (radio)
- Static bar
- Static cling
- Static electricity
- Static forces and virtual-particle exchange
- Static margin
- Static pressure
- Static spacetime
- Static spherically symmetric perfect fluid
- Static universe
- Statics
- Stationary phase approximation
- Stationary spacetime
- Stationary state
- Statistical ensemble (mathematical physics)
- Statistical field theory
- Statistical finance
- Statistical mechanics
- Statistical noise
- Statistical physics
- Statistical thermodynamics
- Statistical weight
- Steady State (Thermodynamics)
- Steady State theory
- Steady state
- Steam devil
- Stefan Bernhard
- Stefan Hell
- Stefan Marinov
- Stefan Meyer (physicist)
- Ștefan Procopiu
- Stefan Rozental
- Stefan problem
- Stefan–Boltzmann constant
- Stefan–Boltzmann law
- Steinhart–Hart equation
- Stellar birthline
- Stellar black hole
- Stellar drift
- Stellar dynamics
- Stellar evolution
- Stellar kinematics
- Stellar magnetic field
- Stellar nucleosynthesis
- Stellar pulsations
- Stellarator
- Step response
- Stephan Herminghaus
- Stephan von Molnár
- Stephanie Wehner
- Stephen Barr
- Stephen Blundell
- Stephen D. Levene
- Stephen Gray (scientist)
- Stephen H. Davis
- Stephen Hawking
- Stephen Hsu
- Stephen L. Adler
- Stephen Parke
- Stephen Quake
- Stephen Salter
- Stephen Shenker
- Stephen Thorndike
- Stephen Thorsett
- Stephen Wolfram
- Steradian
- Stereopsis
- Stereoscopy
- Sterile neutrino
- Stern–Gerlach Medal
- Stern–Gerlach experiment
- Steven Chu
- Steven E. Jones
- Steven Frautschi
- Steven Girvin
- Steven Gubser
- Steven Gwon Sheng Louie
- Steven MacLean (astronaut)
- Steven Orszag
- Steven R. White
- Steven Soter
- Steven Weinberg
- Stewart–Tolman effect
- Sticking coefficient
- Sticky bead argument
- Stiction
- Stiffness
- Stilb (unit)
- Stimulated emission
- Sting jet
- Stirling Colgate
- Stirling cycle
- Stirling engine
- Stjepan Mohorovičić
- Stochastic cooling
- Stochastic electrodynamics
- Stochastic interpretation
- Stochastic resonance
- Stochastic vacuum model
- Stockbridge damper
- Stoddard engine
- Stokes' law
- Stokes' law (sound attenuation)
- Stokes' theorem
- Stokes (unit)
- Stokes Equations
- Stokes boundary layer
- Stokes drift
- Stokes flow
- Stokes number
- Stokes operator
- Stokes operators
- Stokes parameters
- Stokes relations
- Stokes shift
- Stokes stream function
- Stokes wave
- Stokesian dynamics
- Stoletov's law
- Stoletov curve
- Stoner–Wohlfarth theory
- Stoner–Wohlfarth astroid
- Stoner–Wohlfarth model
- Stoney units
- Stopping and Range of Ions in Matter
- Stopping power (particle radiation)
- Storage ring
- Storm surge
- Strain energy density function
- Strain energy release rate
- Strain hardening exponent
- Strain scanning
- Strain tensor
- Strange B meson
- Strange matter
- Strange quark
- Strangelet
- Strangeness
- Strangeness production
- Strange–Rahman–Smith equation
- Strato of Lampsacus
- Straw chamber
- Straw tracker
- Streak camera
- Stream function
- Stream thrust averaging
- Streaming vibration current/potential
- Streamline curvature theorem
- Streamline diffusion
- Streamlines, streaklines, and pathlines
- Strength constant
- Strength of materials
- Stress (mechanics)
- Stress concentration
- Stress intensity factor
- Stress measures
- Stress relaxation
- Stress–energy tensor
- Stress–energy–momentum pseudotensor
- Stretch rule
- String-net
- String-net liquid
- String (physics)
- String background
- String cosmology
- String duality
- String frame and Einstein frame
- String resonance
- String theory
- String theory landscape
- Strominger's equations
- Strong confinement limit
- Strong gravity
- Strong interaction
- Strongly correlated quantum spin liquid
- Strontium ruthenate
- Strouhal number
- Structural stability
- Structure and Interpretation of Classical Mechanics
- Structure constants
- Structure factor
- Structure formation
- Structure of liquids and glasses
- Structureless particle
- Stuart Ballantine
- Stuart Parkin
- Stuart Thomas Butler
- Stueckelberg action
- Subatomic particle
- Subatomic scale
- Subcircuit board
- Subcooled liquid
- Subcooling
- Subcritical reactor
- Subharmonic
- Subhelic arc
- Subir Sachdev
- Sublimation (Physics)
- Sublimation (phase transition)
- Subparhelic circle
- Subrahmanyan Chandrasekhar
- Subsonic and transonic wind tunnel
- Subsonic flight
- Substellar object
- Substitution method
- Subsun
- Subsynchronous orbit
- Subwavelength imaging
- Subwavelength optics
- Suction
- Sudbury Neutrino Observatory
- Sudden ionospheric disturbance
- Sudestada
- Suhas Patankar
- Sulamith Goldhaber
- Sultan Bashiruddin Mahmood
- Sum-frequency generation
- Sum-over-paths
- Sum frequency generation spectroscopy
- Sum rule in quantum mechanics
- Sumio Iijima
- Sun
- Sun dog
- Sun glitter
- Sun photometer
- Sun valve
- Sundance Bilson-Thompson
- Sunil Mukhi
- Sunlight
- Sunspot
- Sunstone (medieval)
- Sunyaev–Zel'dovich effect
- Super-Kamiokande
- Super-Poincaré algebra
- Super-lens
- Super-low frequency
- SuperB
- SuperGrid
- Super Dual Auroral Radar Network
- Super Large Hadron Collider
- Super Proton Synchrotron
- Super QCD
- Super Virasoro algebra
- Super black
- Super high frequency
- Super lens
- Superatom
- Supercavitation
- Supercell (crystal)
- Supercharge
- Supercluster
- Superconducting Super Collider
- Superconducting coherence length
- Superconducting magnet
- Superconducting magnetic energy storage
- Superconducting nanowire single-photon detector
- Superconducting quantum computing
- Superconducting radio frequency
- Superconducting tunnel junction
- Superconducting wire
- Superconductivity
- Superconductor Insulator Transition
- Superconformal algebra
- Supercontinuum
- Supercooling
- Supercritical airfoil
- Supercritical flow
- Supercritical fluid
- Supercurrent
- Superdeformation
- Superdense carbon allotropes
- Superdeterminism
- Superdiamagnetism
- Superdiffeomorphism
- Superexchange
- Superferromagnetism
- Superficial X-rays
- Superfield
- Superflare
- Superfluid film
- Superfluid helium-4
- Superfluid vacuum
- Superghost
- Superglass
- Supergraph
- Supergravity
- Supergroup (physics)
- Superheating
- Superhydrophobe
- Superinsulator
- Superlattice
- Superlens
- Superlense
- Superlenses
- Superlubricity
- Superluminal motion
- Supermanifold
- Supermassive black hole
- Supermatrix
- Supermatrix (supersymmetry)
- Supermultiplet
- Supernova
- Supernova Early Warning System
- Supernova nucleosynthesis
- Supernova remnant
- Superoperator
- Superoscillation
- Superparamagnetism
- Superpartner
- Superposition principle
- Superpotential
- Superprism
- Superradiance
- Superradiant laser
- Supersaturation
- Superseded scientific theories
- Superselection
- Superselection rule
- Supersolid
- Supersonic fracture
- Supersonic speed
- Supersonic wind tunnel
- Superspace
- Supersplit supersymmetry
- Superstatistics
- Superstring theory
- Superstructure (condensed matter)
- Supersymmetric gauge theory
- Supersymmetric quantum mechanics
- Supersymmetry
- Supersymmetry algebra
- Supersymmetry breaking
- Supersymmetry breaking scale
- Supersymmetry in quantum gravity
- Supersymmetry nonrenormalization theorems
- Supplee's paradox
- Supplemento al Nuovo Cimento
- Supralateral arc
- Suprathreshold stochastic resonance
- Sura Ionospheric Heating Facility
- Suraj N. Gupta
- Surely You're Joking, Mr. Feynman!
- Surface-tension values
- Surface Evolver
- Surface Science Reports
- Surface Water Simulation Modelling Programme
- Surface X-ray Diffraction (SXRD)
- Surface charge
- Surface conductivity
- Surface core level shift
- Surface energy
- Surface equivalence principle
- Surface extended X-ray absorption fine structure
- Surface force
- Surface forces apparatus
- Surface freezing
- Surface gravity
- Surface layer
- Surface phenomenon
- Surface phonon
- Surface photovoltage
- Surface plasmon
- Surface plasmon polaritons
- Surface plasmon resonance
- Surface power density
- Surface reconstruction
- Surface science
- Surface selection rule
- Surface states
- Surface tension
- Surfatron
- Survey magnetometers
- Survey meter
- Susan Cooper (physicist)
- Susan Houde-Walter
- Susan Hough
- Susceptance
- Susceptor
- Susskind–Hawking battle
- Sustain
- Sustained Spheromak Physics Experiment
- Svante Arrhenius
- Sven Kullander (physicist)
- Sverdrup wave
- Swami Jnanananda
- Swampland (physics)
- Swan band
- Swapan Chattopadhyay
- Sweep theory
- Swell (ocean)
- Swept wing
- Swihart velocity
- Swinging Atwood's machine
- Swiss Light Source
- Swiss roll (metamaterial)
- Sydney Chapman (mathematician)
- Sylvester James Gates
- Sylvia Fedoruk
- Sylwester Porowski
- Symbol rate
- Symbolic dynamics
- Symmetry (disambiguation)
- Symmetry (physics)
- Sympathetic cooling
- Sympathetic resonance
- Symplectic integrator
- Symplectomorphism
- Synchrocyclotron
- Synchronous coordinates
- Synchronous frame
- Synchronous orbit
- Synchrophasotron
- Synchrotron
- Synchrotron Radiation Center
- Synchrotron Radiation Source
- Synchrotron X-ray tomographic microscopy
- Synchrotron light source
- Synchrotron radiation
- Synergetics (Haken)
- Synroc
- Synthesis of precious metals
- Synthetic Metals
- Synthetic aperture sonar
- Synthetic element
- Synthetic gauge field
- Synthetic jet
- Synthetic schlieren
- Syntropy (Software)
- Syun-Ichi Akasofu
- Szczepan Szczeniowski
- Sándor Gaál
- Sándor Szalay (physicist)
- Sénarmont prism
- Sérgio Mascarenhas de Oliveira
- Søren Absalon Larsen
- Søren H. H. Larsen
