= Diddams =

Diddams is a surname. Notable people with the surname include:

- Harry Diddams (1864–1929), Australian printer and politician
- Nicholas Diddams (c. 1760–1823), English shipbuilder
- Scott Diddams (fl. 2000), American physicist
