= SSAP =

SSAP may refer to:

- Social Sciences Academic Press, press in Beijing, China
- Source Service Access Point, OSI network endpoint defined in IEEE 802.2
- Sequential structure alignment program, double dynamic programming method in Structural alignment
- Statements of Standard Accounting Practice, in Generally Accepted Accounting Principles (UK)
- Statement of Statutory Accounting Principles, for insurance in the United States
- Story Stem Assessment Profile, method for attachment measures
- SSAP, ICAO code for Apucarana Airport (APU), Paraná state, Brazil
