= Second-order =

Second-order may refer to:

== Mathematics ==
- Second order approximation, an approximation that includes quadratic terms
- Second-order arithmetic, an axiomatization allowing quantification of sets of numbers
- Second-order differential equation, a differential equation in which the highest derivative is the second
- Second-order logic, an extension of predicate logic
- Second-order perturbation, in perturbation theory

== Science and technology ==
- Second-order cybernetics, the recursive application of cybernetics to itself and the reflexive practice of cybernetics according to this critique.
- Second-order fluid, an extension of fluid dynamics
- Second order Fresnel lens, a size of lighthouse lens
- Second-order reaction, a reaction in which the rate is proportional to the square of a reactant's concentration

== Psychology and philosophy ==
- Second-order conditioning, a form of learning from previous learning
- Second-order desire, the desire to have a desire for something
- Second-order stimulus, a visual stimulus distinguished by an aspect other than luminance

== Other uses ==
- Second Order (religious), the cloistered nuns who are affiliated with mendicant orders of friars
