= SFP =

SFP may refer to:

== Organizations ==
- Salton Inc. (former stock symbol: SFP), now part of Russell Hobbs, Inc.
- Scottish Family Party, Scottish conservative political party
- Swedish People's Party of Finland, a Swedish minority and mainly liberal party in Finland
- Syrian Free Press, a Syrian social news network
- Secretariat of the Civil Service (Spanish: Secretaría de la Función Pública), a Mexican cabinet agency
- Société Française de Psychanalyse, a former French psychoanalytic body

== Entertainment ==
- School Food Punishment, a Japanese band
- Strange Fruit Project, a hip-hop group
- Strong Female Protagonist, an American superhero webcomic

== Science and technology ==
- Science fiction prototyping, the idea of using science fiction to explore future technologies and their social implications
- Seminal fluid protein, a non-sperm component of semen
- Simulated fluorescence process algorithm, a scientific 3D rendering method based on physical light/matter interaction
- Single feature polymorphism, a genetic marker
- Small Form-factor Pluggable transceiver, a modular, media-specific transceiver for a network interface
- Space flight participant, a person involved in space tourism
- Specific fan power, a function of the volume flow of the fan and the electrical power input
- Spent fuel pool, a storage pool for spent nuclear reactor fuel
- System File Protection, a technology in Microsoft Windows to prevent "DLL hell"

== Other uses ==
- Single Farm Payment, an EU grant scheme
- Science Focus Program, a public magnet high school in Lincoln, Nebraska, US
- St. Francis Preparatory School, a private, independent Catholic college preparatory school in Fresh Meadows, New York City, New York
- Sustainability Facility Professional, a professional credential awarded by the International Facility Management Association
