= Silicon (disambiguation) =

Silicon is a chemical element with symbol Si and atomic number 14.

Silicon may also refer to:

- Silicon (journal), a scientific journal
- Semiconductor device fabrication
  - Apple silicon, a series of processors designed by Apple
  - HiSilicon, fabless semiconductor company owned by Huawei
- Silicon (musician), stage name of New Zealand musician Kody Nielson

== See also ==
- Isotopes of silicon
- List of places with "Silicon" names
- Si (disambiguation)
