= Shengwang Du =

Shengwang Du is the Scifres Family Professor of Electrical and Computer Engineering, and also a Professor of Physics and Astronomy, at Purdue University. Prior to Purdue, he held the Francis S. and Maurine G. Johnson Chair Professorship at the University of Texas at Dallas (2021-2024). Du had been at the Hong Kong University of Science and Technology from 2008-2020, where he was promoted from assistant professor to associate professor to full professor. His research focuses on quantum optics and its applications in quantum networking, quantum computing, quantum sensing, optical neural networks for AI and optical microscopy. Du’s work in optical microscopy led to the establishment of Light Innovation Technology USA, a startup for commercializing cutting-edge optical microscopies and bioimaging techniques. He holds several positions within the scientific field, including serving as an Associate Editor for Optics Express. He is a Fellow of Optica, a Fellow of the American Physical Society, an Alumni Member of the Hong Kong Young Academy of Sciences, and a Senior Member of the National Academy of Inventors.

He is noted for having led a team that performed an experiment showing individual photons cannot travel faster than the speed of light (c) in vacuum, thus apparently removing one approach to time travel.

Du claims in a peer reviewed journal to have observed single photons' precursors, saying that they travel no faster than c in a vacuum. His experiment involved slow light as well as passing light through a vacuum. He generated two single photons, passing one through rubidium atoms that had been cooled with a laser (thus slowing the light) and passing one through a vacuum. Both times, apparently, the precursors preceded the photons' main bodies, and the precursor traveled at c in a vacuum. According to Du, this implies that there is no possibility of light traveling faster than c (and, thus, violating causality). Some members of the media took this as an indication of proof that time travel to the past using superluminal speeds was impossible.
