= Stephen Thorndike =

American high school physics teacher

- Occupation: Teacher
- Scientific career
- Fields: Physics

Stephen Thorndike is a high school teacher. He is known for discovering, along with astrophysicist Alice C. Quillen, Epsilon Eridani c, a hypothetical planet orbiting the star Epsilon Eridani. After working at the University of Rochester, he now works as a science instructional specialist at Monroe 2 Boces in Spencerport, New York.
