= Superghost =

Type of field in supersymmetry

In a supersymmetric quantum field theory, a superghost is a fermionic Faddeev–Popov ghost, which is used in the gauge fixing of a fermionic symmetry generator.
