= Shkarofsky function =

The Shkarofsky function is a physics formula which describes the behavior of microwaves. It is named after Canadian physicist Issie Shkarofsky (1931-2018), who first identified the function in 1966.

N.M. Temme and S.S. Sazhin later developed this idea further to give what they called the generalized Shkarofsky function.
