= Shakedown (continuum mechanics) =

In continuum mechanics, elastic shakedown behavior is one in which plastic deformation takes place during running in, while due to residual stresses or strain hardening the steady state is perfectly elastic.

Plastic shakedown behavior is one in which the steady state is a closed elastic-plastic loop, with no net accumulation of plastic deformation.

Ratcheting behavior is one in which the steady state is an open elastic-plastic loop, with the material accumulating a net strain during each cycle.

Shakedown concept can be applied to solid metallic materials under cyclic repeated loading or to granular materials under cyclic loading (such case can occur in road pavements under traffic loading).

== Ratcheting Check ==
Not needed for only primary loading that meets static loading requirements.

Needed for cyclic thermal loading plus primary loading with a mean.

== Shakedown of granular materials ==
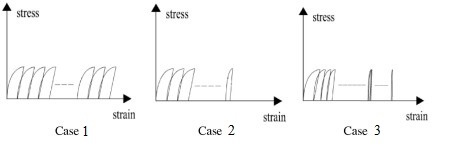
Shakedown cases in granular materials subjected to cyclic loading

If repeated loading on the granular induces stress beyond the yield surface, three different cases may be observed. In case 1 the residual strain in the materials increases almost without limit. This so-called “ratcheting” state is close to what can be predicted applying simple Mohr–Coulomb criterion to a cyclic loading. In the responses like case 2, residual strain in the materials grows to some extent, but at some stage the growth is stopped and further cyclic loading produces closed hysteresis loops of stress–strain. Finally in case 3 the growth of residual strain is practically diminishes when sufficient loading cycles are applied. Case 2 and case 3 are cases of plastic and elastic shakedown respectively.
