= Symmetry (disambiguation) =

Symmetry in mathematics refers to an object that is invariant under some transformations.

Symmetry may also refer to:

== Mathematics, science and technology ==
- Symmetry (geometry), of shapes in a metric space such as the plane
- Symmetry in mathematics, of mathematical structures in general
- Symmetry (physics), a physical or mathematical feature of the system (observed or intrinsic) that is "preserved" under some change
- Symmetry in biology, the balanced distribution of duplicate body parts or shapes
- Molecular symmetry in chemistry
- Symmetry, a line of SMP computers by Sequent Computer Systems

== Arts and entertainment ==
- Symmetry (band), American instrumental duo
- Symmetry (film), a Polish film
- "Symmetry" (Dead Zone), an episode of the television series Dead Zone
- Symmetric scale, in music
- Symmetry (album), a studio album by Canadian rock band Saga
- "Symmetry" (song), a song by Ed Sheeran on the album Play (2025)
- "Symmetry", a song by Little Boots on the album Hands (2009)
- "Symmetry", a song Gabriella Cilmi on the album The Sting (2013)
- "Symmetry", a song by Maggie Rogers on the album Notes from the Archive: Recordings 2011-2016, 2020
- "Symmetry", a song by ReGLOSS on the album ReGLOSS, 2024

== Other uses ==
- Facial symmetry, a component of attractiveness
- "Symmetry", street name of salvinorin B ethoxymethyl ether, a dissociative drug
- Symmetry (horse)
- Symmetry (journal)
