= Stark spectroscopy =

Form of spectroscopy based on the Stark effect

Stark spectroscopy (sometimes known as electroabsorption/emission spectroscopy) is a form of spectroscopy based on the Stark effect. In brief, this technique makes use of the Stark effect (or electrochromism) either to reveal information about the physiochemical or physical properties of a sample using a well-characterized electric field or to reveal information about an electric field using a reference sample with a well-characterized Stark effect.

The use of the term "Stark effect" differs between the disciplines of chemistry and physics. Physicists tend to use the more classical definition of the term (see Stark effect), while chemists usually use the term to refer to what is technically electrochromism. In the former case, the applied electric field splits the atomic energy levels and is the electric field analog of the Zeeman effect. However, in the latter case, the applied electric field changes the molar absorption coefficient of the sample, which can be measured using traditional absorption or emission spectroscopic methods. This effect is known as electrochromism.

== See also ==
- Stark effect
- Plasma diagnostics
