= Laurent Nottale =

French scientist

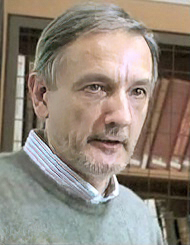
- Born: 29 July 1952 (age 74)
- Known for: Gravitational Lens, Scale relativity
- Scientific career
- Fields: Physics
- Workplaces: CNRS, Paris observatory

Laurent Nottale (born 29 July 1952) is an astrophysicist, a retired director of research at CNRS, and a researcher at the Paris Observatory. He is the author and inventor of the theory of scale relativity, which aims to unify quantum physics and relativity theory.

== Scientific career ==
Nottale began his professional work in the domain of general relativity. In June 1980 he defended his PhD Thesis, entitled "Perturbation of the Hubble relation by clusters of galaxies", in which he showed that clusters of galaxies as a whole may act as gravitational lenses on distant sources. Some of these results were reported in Nature.

He also published a popular book, L'Univers et la Lumière (Flammarion, Nouvelle Bibliothèque Scientifique 1994, Champs 1998) for which he received a prize in 1995 (Prix du livre d'Astronomie Haute-Maurienne-Vanoise).

According to Vincent Bontems and Yves Gingras there are two distinct phases in Nottale's scientific career. From 1975 to 1991 this included conventional topics, such as gravitational lenses, while from 1984 onwards he focused on developing his theory of scale relativity, a proposal for a theory of physics based on fractal space-time.

== The theory of scale relativity ==
The theory of scale relativity emerged out of a desire to establish a foundation for quantum mechanics based on first physical principles: the principle of relativity, the geometric interpretation of physical properties and the optimization principle interpreted as a geodesic principle. In a similar way that gravity is the manifestation of the intrinsic curved geometry of spacetime in general relativity, the quantum properties here are the manifestation of another property of spacetime at small scales, its intrinsic non-differentiability. Besides proposing a better foundation for microphysical quantum mechanics, it also proposes that many macroscopic classical systems with highly chaotic behaviour can be considered as non-differentiable and thus described by macroscopic quantum-like laws. Examples of such applications are: planetary formation in the protoplanetary disk phase, violent ejection processes such as the creation of planetary nebulae or turbulence in fluids. The proposal has not attracted wide acceptance by the scientific community.

== Selected publications ==
- Scale Relativity And Fractal Space-Time: A New Approach to Unifying Relativity and Quantum Mechanics. 2011 1st ed. World Scientific Publishing Company. (ISBN 1848166508)
- Fractal Space-Time and Micro-physics, Editions World Scientific, May 1993 (ISBN 9810208782) (The reference book about Scale Relativity theory).
- L'univers et la lumière, Cosmologie classique et mirages gravitationnels, Éditions Flammarion, août 1993 (ISBN 2082111830)
- La Relativité dans tous ses états : du mouvements aux changements d'échelle, Éditions Hachette, 1998 (ISBN 201279002X)
- Les arbres de l'évolution, Laurent Nottale, Jean Chaline et Pierre Grou, Éditions Hachette, mars 2000 (ISBN 2012355528)

== See also ==
- Fractal cosmology
