= Slip melting point =

Property of a waxy solid

The Slip melting point (SMP) or "slip point" is one conventional definition of the melting point of a waxy solid. It is determined by casting a 10 mm column of the solid in a glass tube with an internal diameter of about 1 mm and a length of about 80 mm, and then immersing it in a temperature-controlled water bath. The slip point is the temperature at which the column of the solid begins to rise in the tube due to buoyancy, and because the outside surface of the solid is molten.

This is a popular method for fats and waxes, because they tend to be mixtures of compounds with a range of molecular masses, without well-defined melting points.
