= S-brane =

In string theory, an S-brane is a hypothetical and controversial counterpart of the D-brane, which is localized in time. Depending on the context the "S" stands for "Strominger", "Sen", or "Space-like". The S-brane was originally proposed by Andrew Strominger in his speculative paper, and another version of S-branes was studied by Ashoke Sen. They are thought to be extended in the space-like/temporal directions only, so that they exist at only one point in time, but are otherwise analogous to p-branes.
