= Stephan von Molnár =

American physicist (1935–2020)

Dr. Stephan von Molnár (June 26, 1935 – November 17, 2020) was an American academic physicist. He served as Professor of Physics at Florida State University and Director of MARTECH (Center for Materials Research and Technology). He was a recipient of the Alexander von Humboldt Foundation Senior U.S. Scientist Award.

His materials expertise centers on rare earth metals and alloys, transition metal based diluted magnetic semiconductors, and the perovskite type HiTc and CMR compounds. As part of his research on the magnetic nano-particles, he had collaborated in the development of a novel Hall gradiometer for their magnetic characterization. His innovations in nano-magnetic particles have been applied in such areas as storage technologies and magnetic sensing devices.

Before joining the Florida State University faculty, he served on the Research Staff of the IBM Thomas J. Watson Research Center, where he held various management positions.

von Molnár died on November 17, 2020.
