= Semiconductor fault diagnostics =

Semiconductor fault diagnostics are predictive software algorithms which are used to refine and localize the circuitry responsible for the failure of scan-based devices.

== Fault Diagnostic Applications ==
Software-based fault diagnostics are used by semiconductor designers to provide information that can be used to improve or repair a semiconductor circuit. Fault diagnostics are used for the purpose of semiconductor yield improvement or for failure analysis.

== Performing Fault Diagnosis ==
The input to a fault diagnostic is a tester datalog showing the failure characteristics of the device. The diagnostic algorithm uses an internal simulation of a fault model of the electrical circuit in order to compare the failure characteristics of the actual device with a set of simulated failure characteristics. Various fault types may be applied to the diagnostic model. Commonly used fault types are:

- stuck-at faults, which simulates a node stuck high or low
- stuck-open fault, which simulates a disconnected node
- bridging faults, which simulate an unwanted connected between two nodes
- transition-delay faults, which simulate slow signal switching on a node

The output produced by fault diagnostics consists of a list of potential failing nodes in the device. Software fault diagnostics only produce a list of ‘’potentially’’ failing nodes. In order to locate the specific failing node, software fault diagnosis may be followed up with some form of physical failure analysis in order to locate the specific failure node.

Some fault diagnostic algorithms estimate the likelihood that a node is responsible for the failure by including a probability rating for each fault candidate listed. This probability rating allows the device analyst to choose which of the nodes to examine first.
