= Shallow donor =

A shallow donor refers to a donor that contributes an electron that exhibits energy states equivalent to atomic hydrogen with an altered expected mass i.e. the long range coulomb potential of the ion-cores determines the energy levels. Essentially the electron orbits the donor ion within the semiconductor material at approximately the bohr radius. This is in contrast to deep level donors where the short range potential determines the energy levels, not the effective mass states. This contributes additional energy states that can be used for conduction.

== Overview ==
Introducing impurities in a semiconductor which are used to set free additional electrons in its conduction band is called doping with donors. In a group IV semiconductor like silicon these are most often group V elements like arsenic or antimony. However, these impurities introduce new energy levels in the band gap affecting the band structure which may alter the electronic properties of the semiconductor to a great extent.

Having a shallow donor level means that these additional energy levels are not more than $3 k_b T$ (0.075 eV at room temperature) away from the lower conduction band edge. This allows us to treat the original semiconductor as unaffected in its electronic properties, with the impurity atoms only increasing the electron concentration. A limit to donor concentration in order to allow treatment as shallow donors is approximately 10^{19} cm^{−3}.

Energy levels due to impurities deeper in the bandgap are called deep levels.
