= Sympathetic cooling =

Sympathetic cooling is a process in which particles of one type cool particles of another type.

Typically, atomic ions that can be directly laser cooled are used to cool nearby ions or atoms, by way of their mutual Coulomb interaction. This technique is used to cool ions and atoms that cannot be cooled directly by laser cooling, which includes most molecular ion species, especially large organic molecules. However, sympathetic cooling is most efficient when the mass/charge ratios of the sympathetic- and laser-cooled ions are similar.

The cooling of neutral atoms in this manner was first demonstrated by Christopher Myatt et al. in 1997. Here, a technique with electric and magnetic fields were used, where atoms with spin in one direction were more weakly confined than those with spin in the opposite direction. The weakly confined atoms with a high kinetic energy were allowed to more easily escape, lowering the total kinetic energy, resulting in a cooling of the strongly confined atoms. Myatt et al. also showed the utility of their version of sympathetic cooling for the creation of Bose–Einstein condensates.
