= Stream thrust averaging =

Process to convert 3D flow into 1D

In fluid dynamics, stream thrust averaging is a process used to convert three-dimensional flow through a duct into one-dimensional uniform flow. It makes the assumptions that the flow is mixed adiabatically and without friction. However, due to the mixing process, there is a net increase in the entropy of the system. Although there is an increase in entropy, the stream thrust averaged values are more representative of the flow than a simple average as a simple average would violate the second law of thermodynamics.

== Equations for a perfect gas ==
Stream thrust:

$$F = \int \left(\rho \mathbf{V} \cdot d \mathbf{A} \right) \mathbf{V} \cdot \mathbf{f} +\int pd \mathbf{A} \cdot \mathbf{f}.$$

Mass flow:

$$\dot m = \int \rho \mathbf{V} \cdot d \mathbf{A}.$$

Stagnation enthalpy:

$$H = {1 \over \dot m} \int \left({\rho \mathbf{V} \cdot d \mathbf{A}} \right) \left( h+ {|\mathbf{V}|^2 \over 2} \right),$$

$$\overline{U}^2 \left({1- {R \over 2C_p}}\right) -\overline{U}{F\over \dot m} +{HR \over C_p}=0.$$

=== Solutions ===
Solving for $\overline{U}$ yields two solutions. They must both be analyzed to determine which is the physical solution. One will usually be a subsonic root and the other a supersonic root. If it is not clear which value of velocity is correct, the second law of thermodynamics may be applied.

$$\overline{\rho} = {\dot m \over \overline{U}A},$$

$$\overline{p} = {F \over A} -{\overline{\rho} \overline{U}^2},$$

$$\overline{h} = {\overline{p} C_p \over \overline{\rho} R}.$$

Second law of thermodynamics:

$$\nabla s = C_p \ln({\overline{T}\over T_1}) +R \ln({\overline{p} \over p_1}).$$

The values $T_1$ and $p_1$ are unknown and may be dropped from the formulation. The value of entropy is not necessary, only that the value is positive.

$$\nabla s = C_p \ln(\overline{T}) +R \ln(\overline{p}).$$

One possible unreal solution for the stream thrust averaged velocity yields a negative entropy. Another method of determining the proper solution is to take a simple average of the velocity and determining which value is closer to the stream thrust averaged velocity.
