= Solomon Saltiel =

Solomon Mois Saltiel
- Born: 31 August 1947; Sofia, Bulgaria
- Died: 7 May 2009 (aged 61); Sofia, Bulgaria
- Scientific career
- Fields: Physics
- Workplaces: Sofia University; Moscow State University; Bulgarian Academy of Sciences
- Doctoral advisor: S. A. Achmanov

Solomon Mois Saltiel (Bulgarian: Соломон Моис Салтиел), (31 August 1947 – 7 May 2009) was a Bulgarian physicist, researcher and university lecturer.

== Biography ==
Prof. Saltiel graduated in physics from the Moscow State University in 1973. His doctoral thesis, under the supervision of the professor S. A. Akhmanov was devoted to multiphoton nonresonant processes in crystals. From 1977 on he continued his research in nonlinear optics at Sofia University "Sv. Kliment Ohridski" and in 1995 was awarded tenure.

Since 2004 Saltiel was an elected corresponding member of the Bulgarian Academy of Sciences. He served in the Physics Department Board and was member of the Bulgarian Physical Society, the Optical Society of America and the European Physical Society.

His area of research included nonlinear optics, cascade nonlinear-optical processes, optical phase conjugation, nonlinear-optical susceptibilities, picosecond lasers, generation and measurement of ultra short pulses and high resolution spectroscopy.

He authored or co-authored more than 184 research papers, with 244.2 Impact Points and 614 citations.

== Honours and awards ==
- 1985 Award of Bulgarian Ministry of Education and Science
- 2000 Award of University of Sofia, Honorary Medal, I degree

== See also ==
- Cross-polarized wave generation
