= Small article monitor =

A Small Article Monitor or SAM is a monitoring device designed to screen small items such as helmets for radioactive contamination. It uses four to six plastic scintillation detectors, located on the sides of the chamber. Operation of the instrument is controlled from an integral terminal. The instrument performs a self-test and acquires a new Background count each time it is powered up. It also monitors its own operation during normal use and indicates any failures. It runs continuously, updating backgrounds whenever no weight is detected inside the chamber. A new count is initiated every time a door open/door close sequence is detected.

Because of interference caused by other sources, a Geiger counter would be rendered ineffective within the walls of a nuclear containment building for screening individual articles (i.e., clothing, tools, etc.). A SAM has thick lead walls, which shield the internal scintillation detectors from outside radiation, this allows it to accurately measure the amount of radiation and the type of radionuclides present. SAMs range in weight from 800 kg (1765 lbs) to 1600 kg (3530 lbs) .
