= Substitution method =

Substitution method may refer to:

- Substitution method (optical fiber), a way to calculate power loss in fiber optic cables
- Substitution method (optimization), the solution method to simple constrained optimization problems
- Substitution method (primary energy), a way to calculate the equivalent primary energy of a non fossil fuel source of electricity

== See also ==
- Epsilon substitution method in calculus
- Weierstrass substitution method, a name sometimes used for tangent half-angle substitution in calculus
- Substitution (algebra)
- Substitution (logic)
