= Strain scanning =

In physics, strain scanning is the general name for various techniques that aim to measure the strain in a crystalline material through its effect on the diffraction of X-rays and neutrons. In these methods the material itself is used as a form of strain gauge.

The various methods are derived from powder diffraction but look for the small shifts in the diffraction spectrum that indicate a change in a lattice parameter instead of trying to derive unknown structural information. By comparing the lattice parameter to a known reference value it is possible to determine the. If sufficient measurements are made in different directions it is possible to derive the strain tensor. If the elastic properties of the material are known, one can then compute the stress tensor.

== Principles ==
At its most basic level strain scanning uses shifts in Bragg diffraction peaks to determine the strain. Strain is defined as the change in length (shift in lattice parameter, d) divided by the original length (unstrained lattice parameter, d_{0}). In diffraction based strain scanning this becomes the change in peak position divided by the original position. The precise equation is presented in terms of diffraction angle, energy, or - for relatively slow moving neutrons - time of flight:

$$\epsilon = \frac{\Delta d}{d_0} = \frac{\Delta \theta}{\theta_0} = \frac{\Delta E}{E_0} = \frac{\Delta t}{t_0} \,$$

== Methods ==
The details of the technique are heavily influenced by the type of radiation used since lab X-rays, synchrotron X-rays and neutrons have very different properties. Nevertheless, there is considerable overlap between the various methods.
