= Stokes equation =

Stokes equation may refer to:

- the Airy equation
- the equations of Stokes flow, a linearised form of the Navier–Stokes equations in the limit of small Reynolds number
- Stokes law
