= Single-particle spectrum =

Continuum of a physical particle-based quantity

The single-particle spectrum is a distribution of a physical quantity such as energy or momentum.

In formal Quantum field theory, a single-particle spectrum is defined as: "the spectrum of the operators of H, P on the space B."

The study of particle spectra allows us to visualize the global picture of particle production. This is especially helpful for visualizing the structure of nanoparticles.

The existence of a "non-smooth" single-particle spectrum is a piece of evidence (proof) that the Fermi level exists.

The spectrum are particles that are in space: "the single particle spectrum overlaps ... and the excitations of the electron gas becomes a particle." This process uses Raman spectroscopy, developed by Chandrasekhar Venkata Raman.
