= Synthetic gauge field =

Field used in the dynamics of ultracold quantum gases

In Atomic, molecular, and optical physics synthetic gauge fields (or artificial gauge fields) are effective gauge fields which, by experimental design, affect the dynamics of atoms in ultracold quantum gases. Most commonly, the simulated gauge field is an effective electromagnetic field (an example of an Abelian gauge field) that has been introduced either by rotation of a quantum gas (resulting from the correspondence between the Lorentz force and the Coriolis force) or by imprinting a spatially varying geometric phase through an atom-laser interaction scheme. Recently, some attention has turned toward the possibility of realizing synthetic dynamical gauge fields with quantum gas apparatus, with the long-term goal of leveraging the platform for quantum simulations of problems relevant to Standard Model physics.
