= Shashlik (physics) =

Layout for a sampling calorimeter in high energy physics detectors

In high energy physics detectors, shashlik is a layout for a sampling calorimeter. It refers to a stack of alternating slices of absorber (e.g. lead, brass) and scintillator materials (crystal or plastic), which is penetrated by a wavelength shifting fiber running perpendicular to the absorber and scintillator tiles.

The absorber has a small interaction length, so that a particle radiates energy in a short track. The scintillator material produces visible light when transversed by the particle's radiated energy. This occurs with an electromagnetic calorimeter, in the form of photons and/or electron+positron pairs. The energy of the particle may be then measured by the intensity of scintillation light produced by the various scintillator slices. An example detector that uses a shashlik electromagnetic calorimeter is the LHCb detector.

This type of calorimeter was likely named after the shashlik, a popular form of shish kebab sold by street vendors in the former Soviet Union, by the Russian and Ukrainian scientists who first proposed it.
