= Silvo Breskvar =

Slovenian physicist and mathematician

Silvo Breskvar (December 31, 1902 – January 3, 1969 in Ljubljana) was a Yugoslav mathematician and physicist.
