= Sending loudness rating =

Audio measurement

The sending loudness rating (SLR) is a measure of the loudness of the transmit audio sent through the microphone of a communication device (for example, a mobile phone) It compares the Sound intensity of the sound waves into the microphone to the resulting audio signal. It is measured in dBV/Pa.

For telephony, the reference sound pressure level is 20 micro-Pascals, with values in dB referenced to that value.

20 micro-Pascals is called the Threshold of human hearing, and is equal to 0 dB Sound pressure level (SPL).

ITU-T recommendation P.79 has the frequency weighted sensitivity calculations in it for sending loudness rating (SLR) and receive loudness rating (RLR) for telephony.
