= Strominger's equations =

In heterotic string theory, the Strominger's equations are the set of equations that are necessary and sufficient conditions for spacetime supersymmetry. It is derived by requiring the 4-dimensional spacetime to be maximally symmetric, and adding a warp factor on the internal 6-dimensional manifold.

Consider a metric $\omega$ on the real 6-dimensional internal manifold Y and a Hermitian metric h on a vector bundle V. The equations are:

1. The 4-dimensional spacetime is Minkowski, i.e., $g=\eta$.
2. The internal manifold Y must be complex, i.e., the Nijenhuis tensor must vanish $N=0$.
3. The Hermitian form $\omega$ on the complex threefold Y, and the Hermitian metric h on a vector bundle V must satisfy,
  1. $\partial\bar{\partial}\omega=i\text{Tr}F(h)\wedge F(h)-i\text{Tr}R^{-}(\omega)\wedge R^{-}(\omega),$
  2. $d^{\dagger}\omega=i(\partial-\bar{\partial})\text{ln}||\Omega ||,$
    where $R^{-}$ is the Hull-curvature two-form of $\omega$, F is the curvature of h, and $\Omega$ is the holomorphic n-form; F is also known in the physics literature as the Yang-Mills field strength. Li and Yau showed that the second condition is equivalent to $\omega$ being conformally balanced, i.e., $d(||\Omega ||_\omega \omega^2)=0$.
4. The Yang–Mills field strength must satisfy,
  1. $\omega^{a\bar{b}} F_{a\bar{b}}=0,$
  2. $F_{ab}=F_{\bar{a}\bar{b}}=0.$

These equations imply the usual field equations, and thus are the only equations to be solved.

However, there are topological obstructions in obtaining the solutions to the equations;

1. The second Chern class of the manifold, and the second Chern class of the gauge field must be equal, i.e., $c_2(M)=c_2(F)$
2. A holomorphic n-form $\Omega$ must exists, i.e., $h^{n,0}=1$ and $c_1=0$.

In case V is the tangent bundle $T_Y$ and $\omega$ is Kähler, we can obtain a solution of these equations by taking the Calabi–Yau metric on $Y$ and $T_Y$.

Once the solutions for the Strominger's equations are obtained, the warp factor $\Delta$, dilaton $\phi$ and the background flux H, are determined by

1. $\Delta(y)=\phi(y)+\text{constant}$,
2. $\phi(y)=\frac{1}{8} \text{ln}||\Omega||+\text{constant}$,
3. $H=\frac{i}{2}(\bar{\partial}-\partial)\omega.$
