= Superstatistics =

Superstatistics is a branch of statistical mechanics or statistical physics devoted to the study of non-linear and non-equilibrium systems. It is characterized by using the superposition of multiple differing statistical models to achieve the desired non-linearity. In terms of ordinary statistical ideas, this is equivalent to compounding the distributions of random variables and it may be considered a simple case of a doubly stochastic model.

Consider an extended thermodynamical system which is locally in equilibrium and has a Boltzmann distribution, that is the probability of finding the system in a state with energy $E$ is proportional to $\exp(-\beta E)$. Here $\beta$ is the local inverse temperature. A non-equilibrium thermodynamical system is modeled by considering macroscopic fluctuations of the local inverse temperature. These fluctuations happen on time scales which are much larger than the microscopic relaxation times to the Boltzmann distribution. If the fluctuations of $\beta$ are characterized by a distribution $f(\beta)$, the superstatistical Boltzmann factor of the system is given by

$$B(E)=\int_0^\infty d\beta f(\beta)\exp(-\beta E).$$

This defines the superstatistical partition function

$$Z = \sum_{i=1}^W B(E_i)$$

for system that can assume discrete energy states $\{E_i\}_{i=1}^W$. The probability of finding the system in state $E_i$ is then given by

$$p_i=\frac{1}{Z}B(E_i).$$

Modeling the fluctuations of $\beta$ leads to a description in terms of statistics of Boltzmann statistics, or "superstatistics". For example, if $\beta$ follows a Gamma distribution, the resulting superstatistics corresponds to Tsallis statistics. Superstatistics can also lead to other statistics such as power-law distributions or stretched exponentials. One needs to note here that the word super here is short for superposition of the statistics.

This branch is highly related to the exponential family and Mixing. These concepts are used in many approximation approaches, like particle filtering (where the distribution is approximated by delta functions) for example.

== See also ==
- Maxwell–Boltzmann statistics
- E.G.D. Cohen
