= Straw chamber =

Type of particle detector using gaseous ionization

A straw chamber is a type of gaseous ionization particle detector. It is a long tube with a wire down the center and a gas which becomes ionized when a particle passes through. A potential difference is maintained between the wire and the walls of the tube, so that once the gas is ionized electrons move in one direction and ions in the other. This produces a current which indicates that a particle has passed through the chamber.

Many straws chambers together can be used to track particles in a straw tracker. The path of a particle is determined by the best fit to all the straws with hits. Since the time for a particular straw to produce a signal is proportional to the distance of the particle's closest approach to that chamber's wire, if a particle on a predictable path (e.g. a helix in a magnetic field) passes through many straws, the path of the particle can be determined more precisely than the size of any particular straw.

== Specific uses ==
There are about 298,000 drift tubes (straws) in the Transition Radiation Tracker (TRT) of the ATLAS experiment at the Large Hadron Collider.

== See also ==
- Proportional counter
- Time projection chamber
