= SUNIST =

Chinese tokamak

Sino-UNIted Spherical Tokamak
- Device type: Spherical tokamak
- Location: Beijing, China
- Affiliation: Tsinghua University

Technical specifications
- Major radius: 30 cm (12 in)
- Minor radius: 23 cm (9.1 in)
- Magnetic field: 0.15 T (1,500 G) (toroidal)
- Plasma current: 30 kA

History
- Year(s) of operation: 2002–present

Links
- Website: SUNIST Laboratory

SUNIST (or Sino-UNIted Spherical Tokamak) is a small spherical tokamak in the Department of Engineering Physics of Tsinghua University, Beijing, China.

== The main parameters of SUNIST ==
Parameter	Symbol	Value
Major radius	R	30 cm
Minor radius	a	23 cm
Elongation ratio	κ	1.6
On-axis magnetic field	B_{0}	1500 gauss (0.15 T)
Typical plasma current	I_{P}	30 kA

== Current research activities ==
Alfven wave current drive experiments in spherical tokamak plasmas Alfven wave can generate toroidal plasma current without density limits. This is very favourable for spherical tokamak plasmas, which have very high dielectric constants that makes LHCD or ECCD very hard.
