= SPEED2000 =

Software for electromagnetic simulation

- Developer(s): Sigrity
- Operating system: Windows
- Type: Technical computing
- License: Proprietary
- Website: SPEED 2000 Product Page

SPEED2000 is a software package designed for electromagnetic simulation for the analysis and design of high-speed electronic systems. It combines an electromagnetic field solver with circuit and transmission line simulations which allows it to compute dynamic electromagnetic interactions within integrated circuits. SPEED2000 provides electrical analysis of integrated circuit (IC) packages and printed circuit boards (PCBs). It is developed and marketed by Sigrity, Inc.

== History ==
The algorithms on which SPEED2000 is based were initially developed by Dr. Jiayuan Fang (then associate professor of Electrical Engineering at Binghamton University) and his students. The electromagnetic simulation algorithms that he developed were 1000 times faster previous methods.

Dr. Fang patented the algorithms (see below) and founded a company called Sigrity, Inc. to further develop the software. He eventually left Binghamton University to work on his software full-time. The rights to the initial patents are owned by Binghamton University and the royalties provide funding for current research efforts at the university.

- U.S. Patent 5,504,423 Method for modeling interactions in multilayered electronic packaging structures
- U.S. Patent 5,566,083 Method for analyzing voltage fluctuations in multilayered electronic packaging structures
