= Scott Anderson (physicist) =

Physicist/Rotarian

Scott Anderson (June 26, 1913 – October 1, 2006) was the founder of Anderson Physics Laboratory in Urbana, Illinois (the predecessor of APL Engineered Materials), a leading provider of metal halides and amalgams to the lighting industry. He received 11 U.S. patents.

He received his B.S. from Illinois Wesleyan University in 1935, M.S. from the University of Illinois in 1937, and Ph.D. from the University of Illinois 1940. During World War II, he worked in the Manhattan Project's Metallurgical Laboratory.

Anderson was a Rotarian and served as the president of the Rotary Club of Champaign, Illinois, from 1963 to 1964. He was a founder of the Urban League of Champaign County and also was instrumental in establishing Project Goodstart (meals for disadvantaged children) and New Beginnings (assistance for released felons in fitting back into civilian society).
