= Supergraph =

In mathematics and physics, the word supergraph has several meanings:

- In graph theory, if A is a subgraph of B, then B is said to be a supergraph of A.
- In the context of particle physics, a supergraph is a Feynman diagram that calculates scattering amplitudes in a supersymmetric theory using the advantages of the superspace formalism.
- Synonym for epigraph, i.e. the set of points lying on or above a function's graph.
