= Silicon (journal) =

- Discipline: Chemistry Inorganic Chemistry Materials Science
- Language: English
- Edited by: David A. Schiraldi

Publication details
- History: 2009-present
- Publisher: Springer (The Netherlands)
- Frequency: Quarterly
- Impact factor: 2.670 (2020)

Standard abbreviations
- ISO 4: Silicon

Indexing
- ISSN: 1876-990X (print); 1876-9918 (web)

Links
- Journal homepage; 1876-990X Online access

Silicon is a peer-reviewed scientific journal published by Springer and founded in 2009 by editor in chief Stephen Clarson. It deals with all aspects of silicon. Published research involves materials biology, materials physics, materials chemistry, materials engineering, and environmental science. The journal caters to chemists, physicists, engineers, biologists, and environmental scientists.
