= Scott Diddams =

American physicist

Scott Diddams holds the Robert H. Davis Chair at the University of Colorado Boulder, where he is also Professor of Electrical Engineering and Physics.John L. Hall He carries out experimental research in the fields of optical frequency combs, precision spectroscopy, nonlinear optics, microwave photonics and ultrafast lasers. He was previously a group leader and Fellow of the National Institute of Standards and Technology (NIST) based in Boulder, Colorado.

While a postdoc in the lab of Nobel laureate John L. Hall, Diddams demonstrated the self-referenced optical frequency comb and subsequently used it to realize the first optical clocks. Throughout his career, he has continued to pioneer the development of frequency combs in multiple platforms and use them in numerous applications--including astronomy, low-noise microwave synthesis, and spectroscopic sensing. He has also been active in the miniaturization of optical frequency combs and atomic clocks.

He is a Fellow of Optica, American Physical Society, and IEEE. Among other awards, he is recipient of the 2017 IEEE UFFC Rabi Award, the Presidential Rank Award in 2021, and the 2023 C.E.K. Mees Medal. In 2025, Diddams was elected to the National Academy of Engineering.
