= Second-order fluid =

A second-order fluid is a fluid where the stress tensor is the sum of all tensors that can be formed from the velocity field with up to two derivatives, much as a Newtonian fluid is formed from derivatives up to first order. This model may be obtained from a retarded motion expansion truncated at the second-order. For an isotropic, incompressible second-order fluid, the total stress tensor is given by

$$\sigma_{ij} = -p \delta_{ij} + \eta_0 A_{ij(1)} + \alpha_1 A_{ik(1)}A_{kj(1)} + \alpha_2 A_{ij(2)},$$

where

$-p \delta_{ij}$ is the indeterminate spherical stress due to the constraint of incompressibility,
$A_{ij(n)}$ is the $n$-th Rivlin–Ericksen tensor,
$\eta_0$ is the zero-shear viscosity,
$\alpha_1$ and $\alpha_2$ are constants related to the zero shear normal stress coefficients.
