= Simulated fluorescence process algorithm =

Computing algorithm

The Simulated Fluorescence Process (SFP) is a computing algorithm used for scientific visualization of 3D data from, for example, fluorescence microscopes. By modeling a physical light/matter interaction process, an image can be computed which shows the data as it would have appeared in reality when viewed under these conditions.

== Principle ==
The algorithm considers a virtual light source producing excitation light that illuminates the object. This casts shadows either on parts of the object itself or on other objects below it. The interaction between the excitation light and the object provokes the emission light, which also interacts with the object before it finally reaches the eye of the viewer.

== See also ==
- Computer graphics lighting
- Rendering (computer graphics)
