= Sedimentation potential =

Sedimentation potential occurs when dispersed particles move under the influence of either gravity or centrifugation or electricity in a medium. This motion disrupts the equilibrium symmetry of the particle's double layer. While the particle moves, the ions in the electric double layer lag behind due to the liquid flow. This causes a slight displacement between the surface charge and the electric charge of the diffuse layer. As a result, the moving particle creates a dipole moment. The sum of all of the dipoles generates an electric field which is called sedimentation potential. It can be measured with an open electrical circuit, which is also called sedimentation current.

There are detailed descriptions of this effect in many books on colloid and interface science.

== Surface energy ==
=== Background related to phenomenon ===
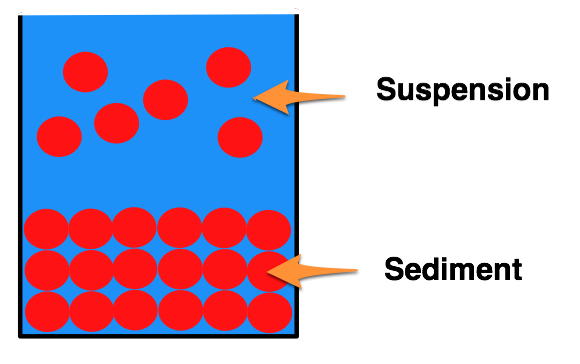
Sedimentation potential

Electrokinetic phenomena are a family of several different effects that occur in heterogeneous fluids or in porous bodies filled with fluid. The sum of these phenomena deals with the effect on a particle from some outside resulting in a net electrokinetic effect.

The common source of all these effects stems from the interfacial 'double layer' of charges. Particles influenced by an external force generate tangential motion of a fluid with respect to an adjacent charged surface. This force may consist of electric, pressure gradient, concentration gradient, gravity. In addition, the moving phase might be either the continuous fluid or dispersed phase.

Sedimentation potential is the field of electrokinetic phenomena dealing with the generation of an electric field by sedimenting colloid particles.

=== History of models ===
This phenomenon was first discovered by Friedrich Ernst Dorn in 1879. He observed that a vertical electric field had developed in a suspension of glass beads in water, as the beads were settling. This was the origin of sedimentation potential, which is often referred to as the Dorn effect.

Smoluchowski built the first models to calculate the potential in the early 1900s. Booth created a general theory on sedimentation potential in 1954 based on Overbeek's 1943 theory on electrophoresis. In 1980, Stigter extended Booth's model to allow for higher surface potentials. Ohshima created a model based on O'Brien and White 's 1978 model used to analyze the sedimentation velocity of a single charged sphere and the sedimentation potential of a dilute suspension.

=== Generation of a potential ===
As a charged particle moves through a gravitational force or centrifugation, an electric potential is induced. While the particle moves, ions in the electric double layer lag behind creating a net dipole moment behind due to liquid flow. The sum of all dipoles on the particle is what causes sedimentation potential. Sedimentation potential has the opposite effect compared to electrophoresis where an electric field is applied to the system. Ionic conductivity is often referred to when dealing with sedimentation potential.

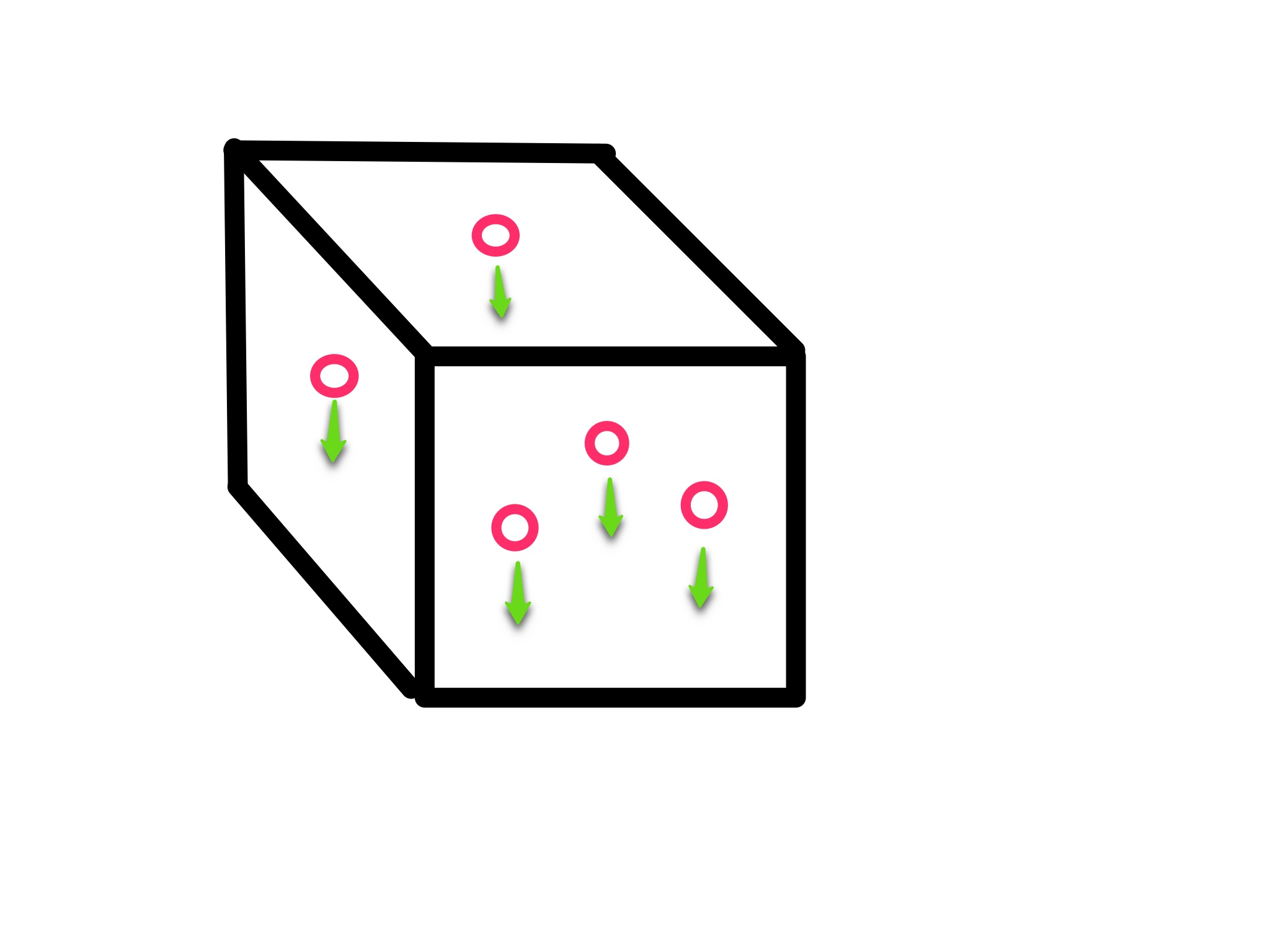
Macroscopic Diagram of Sedementation

The following relation provides a measure of the sedimentation potential due to the settling of charged spheres. First discovered by Smoluchowski in 1903 and 1921. This relationship only holds true for non-overlapping electric double layers and for dilute suspensions. In 1954, Booth proved that this idea held true for Pyrex glass powder settling in a KCl solution. From this relation, the sedimentation potential, E_{S}, is independent of the particle radius and that E_{S} → 0, Φ _{p} → 0 (a single particle).

                         Es=−εζ(ρ−ρ0)ϕpgσ∞η

Smoluchowski's sedimentation potential is defined where ε_{0} is the permittivity of free space, D the dimensionless dielectric constant, ξ the zeta potential, g the acceleration due to gravity, Φ the particle volume fraction, ρ the particle density, ρ_{o} the medium density, λ the specific volume conductivity, and η the viscosity.

Smoluchowski developed the equation under five assumptions:

1. Particles are spherical, nonconducting, and monodispersed.
2. Laminar flow around the particles occurs (Reynolds number <1).
3. Interparticle interactions are negligible.
4. Surface conduction is negligible.
5. The double-layer thickness 1/κ is small compared to the particle radius a (κa>>1).

                               σ∞=e2kBT∑zi2Dini∞

Where D_{i} is the diffusion coefficient of the ith solute species, and n_{i∞} is the number concentration of electrolyte solution.

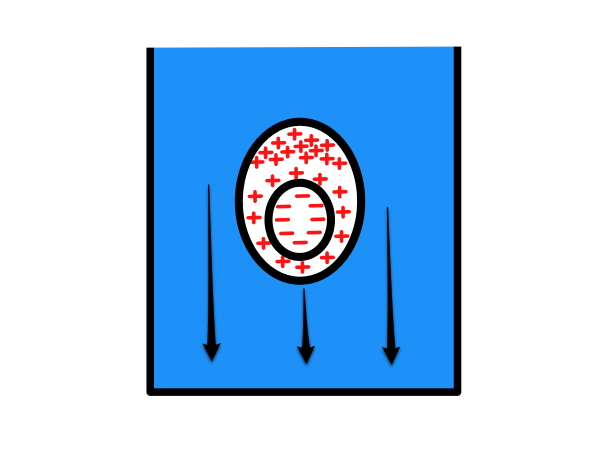
Sedimentation Of A Single Particle Generates a Potential

Ohshima's model was developed in 1984 and was originally used to analyze the sedimentation velocity of a single charged sphere and the sedimentation potential of a dilute suspension. The model provided below holds true for dilute suspensions of low zeta potential, i.e. eζ/κ_{B}T ≤2

                           Es=−εζ(ρ−ρ0)ϕpσ∞ηgH(κα)+ϑ(ζ2)

== Testing ==
=== Measurement ===
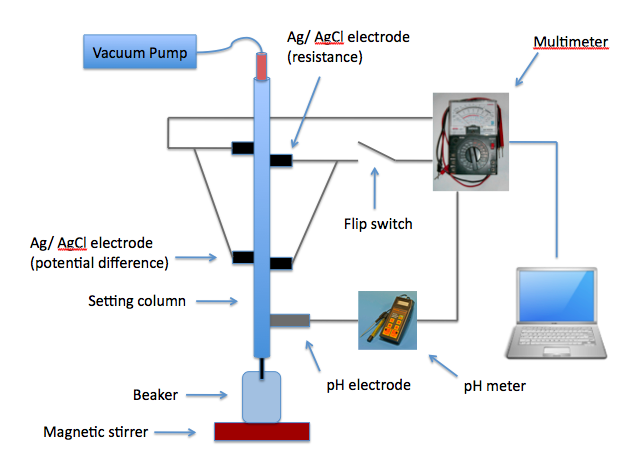
Instrumental Setup to measure Sedimentation Potential

Sedimentation potential is measured by attaching electrodes to a glass column filled with the dispersion of interest. A voltmeter is attached to measure the potential generated from the suspension. To account for different geometries of the electrode, the column is typically rotated 180 degrees while measuring the potential. This difference in potential through rotation by 180 degrees is twice the sedimentation potential. The zeta potential can be determined through measurement by sedimentation potential, as the concentration, conductivity of the suspension, density of the particle, and potential difference are known. By rotating the column 180 degrees, drift and geometry differences of the column can be ignored.

                             ζ=ηλEsεrε0(ρ−ρ0)g

When dealing with the case of concentrated systems, the zeta potential can be determined through measurement of the sedimentation potential $E_{s}$, from the potential difference relative to the distance between the electrodes. The other parameters represent the following: $\eta$ the viscosity of the medium; $\lambda$ the bulk conductivity; $\varepsilon_{r}$ the relative permittivity of the medium; $\varepsilon_{0}$ the permittivity of free space; $\rho$ the density of the particle; $\rho_{0}$ the density of the medium; $g$ is the acceleration due to gravity; and σ^{∞} is the electrical conductivity of the bulk electrolyte solution.

An improved design cell was developed to determine sedimentation potential, specific conductivity, volume fraction of the solids as well as pH. Two pairs of electrodes are used in this set up, one to measure potential difference and the other for resistance. A flip switch is utilized to avoid polarization of the resistance electrodes and buildup of charge by alternating the current. The pH of the system could be monitored and the electrolyte was drawn into the tube using a vacuum pump.

== Applications ==
=== Applications of sedimentation field flow fractionation (SFFF) ===
Sedimentation field flow fractionation (SFFF) is a non-destructive separation technique which can be used for both separation, and collecting fractions. Some applications of SFFF include characterization of particle size of latex materials for adhesives, coatings and paints, colloidal silica for binders, coatings and compounding agents, titanium oxide pigments for paints, paper and textiles, emulsion for soft drinks, and biological materials like viruses and liposomes.

Some main aspects of SFFF include: it provides high-resolution possibilities for size distribution measurements with high precision, the resolution is dependent on experimental conditions, the typical analysis time is 1 to 2 hours, and it is a non-destructive technique which offers the possibility of collecting fraction.

=== Particle size analysis by sedimentation field flow fractionation ===
As sedimentation field flow fractionation (SFFF) is one of field flow fractionation separation techniques, it is appropriate for fractionation and characterization of particulate materials and soluble samples in the colloid size range. Differences in interaction between a centrifugal force field and particles with different masses or sizes lead to the separation. An exponential distribution of particles of a certain size or weight is results due to the Brownian motion. Some of the assumptions to develop the theoretical equations include that there is no interaction between individual particles and equilibrium can occur anywhere in separation channels.

== See also ==
Various combinations of the driving force and moving phase determine various electrokinetic effects. Following "Fundamentals of Interface and Colloid Science" by Lyklema (1995), the complete family of electrokinetic phenomena includes:

Electrokinetic phenomenon	Description of event
Electrophoresis	as motion of particles under influence of electric field
Electro-osmosis	as motion of liquid in porous body under influence of electric field
Diffusiophoresis	as motion of particles under influence of a chemical potential gradient
Capillary osmosis	as motion of liquid in porous body under influence of the chemical potential gradient
Streaming potential / current	as either electric potential or current generated by fluid moving through porous body, or relative to flat surface
Colloid vibration current	as electric current generated by particles moving in fluid under influence of ultrasound
Electric sonic amplitude	as ultrasound generated by colloidal particles in oscillating electric field.
