= Electroacoustic phenomena =

Electric effects caused by ultrasound

Electroacoustic phenomena arise when ultrasound propagates through a fluid containing ions. The associated particle motion generates electric signals because ions have electric charge. This coupling between ultrasound and electric field is called electroacoustic phenomena. The fluid might be a simple Newtonian liquid, or complex heterogeneous dispersion, emulsion or even a porous body. There are several different electroacoustic effects depending on the nature of the fluid.

- Ion vibration current (IVI) and potential, an electric signal that arises when an acoustic wave propagates through a homogeneous fluid.
- Streaming vibration current (SVI) and potential, an electric signal that arises when an acoustic wave propagates through a porous body in which the pores are filled with fluid.
- Colloid vibration current (CVI) and potential, an electric signal that arises when ultrasound propagates through a heterogeneous fluid, such as a dispersion or emulsion.
- Electric sonic amplitude (ESA), the inverse of the CVI effect, in which an acoustic field arises when an electric field propagates through a heterogeneous fluid.

== Ion vibration current ==
Historically, the IVI was the first known electroacoustic effect. It was predicted by Debye in 1933.

== Streaming vibration current ==
The streaming vibration current was experimentally observed in 1948 by Williams. A theoretical model was developed some 30 years later by Dukhin and others. This effect opens another possibility for characterizing the electric properties of the surfaces in porous bodies. A similar effect can be observed at a non-porous surface, when sound is bounced off at an oblique angle. The incident and reflected waves superimpose to cause oscillatory fluid motion in the plane of the interface, thereby generating an AC streaming current at the frequency of the sound waves.

== Double layer compression ==
The electrical double layer can be regarded as behaving like a parallel plate capacitor with a compressible dielectric filling. When sound waves induce a local pressure variation, the spacing of the plates varies at the frequency of the excitation, generating an AC displacement current normal to the interface. For practical reasons this is most readily observed at a conducting surface. It is therefore possible to use an electrode immersed in a conducting electrolyte as a microphone, or indeed as a loudspeaker when the effect is applied in reverse.

== Colloid vibration potential and current ==
Colloid vibration potential measures the AC potential difference generated between two identical relaxed electrodes, placed in the dispersion, if the latter is subjected to an ultrasonic field. When a sound wave travels through a colloidal suspension of particles whose density differs from that of the surrounding medium, inertial forces induced by the vibration of the suspension give rise to a motion of the charged particles relative to the liquid, causing an alternating electromotive force. The manifestations of this electromotive force may be measured, depending on the relation between the impedance of the suspension and that of the measuring instrument, either as colloid vibration potential or as colloid vibration current.

Colloid vibration potential and current was first reported by Hermans and then independently by Rutgers in 1938. It is widely used for characterizing the ζ-potential of various dispersions and emulsions.

== Electric sonic amplitude ==
Electric sonic amplitude was experimentally discovered by Cannon with co-authors in early 1980s. It is also widely used for characterizing ζ-potential in dispersions and emulsions. There is review of this effect theory, experimental verification and multiple applications published by Hunter.

== Theory of CVI and ESA ==
With regard to the theory of CVI and ESA, there was an important observation made by O'Brien. who linked these measured parameters with dynamic electrophoretic mobility μ_{d}.

$$\ CVI(ESA) = A\phi\mu_d\frac{\rho_p-\rho_m}{\rho_m}$$

where

A is calibration constant, depending on frequency, but not particles properties;
ρ_{p} is particle density,
ρ_{m} density of the fluid,
φ is volume fraction of dispersed phase,

Dynamic electrophoretic mobility is similar to electrophoretic mobility that appears in electrophoresis theory. They are identical at low frequencies and/or for sufficiently small particles.

There are several theories of the dynamic electrophoretic mobility. Their overview is given in the Ref.5. Two of them are the most important.

The first one corresponds to the Smoluchowski limit. It yields following simple expression for CVI for sufficiently small particles with negligible CVI frequency dependence:

$$\ CVI(ESA) = A\phi\frac{\varepsilon_0\varepsilon_m\zeta\Kappa_s}{\eta\Kappa_m}\frac{\rho_p-\rho_s}{\rho_s}$$

where:

ε_{0} is vacuum dielectric permittivity,
ε_{m} is fluid dielectric permittivity,
ζ is electrokinetic potential
η is dynamic viscosity of the fluid,
K_{s} is conductivity of the system,
K_{m} is conductivity of the fluid,
ρ_{s} is density of the system.

This remarkably simple equation has same wide range of applicability as Smoluchowski equation for electrophoresis. It is independent on shape of the particles, their concentration.

Validity of this equation is restricted with the following two requirements.

First, it is valid only for a thin double layer, when the Debye length is much smaller than particle's radius a:

$${\kappa}a >> 1$$

Secondly, it neglects the contribution of the surface conductivity. This assumes a small Dukhin number:

$$Du << 1$$

Restriction of the thin double layer limits applicability of this Smoluchowski type theory only to aqueous systems with sufficiently large particles and not very low ionic strength. This theory does not work well for nano-colloids, including proteins and polymers at low ionic strength. It is not valid for low- or non-polar fluids.

There is another theory that is applicable for the other extreme case of a thick double layer, when

$${\kappa}a < 1$$

This theory takes into consideration the double layer overlap that inevitably occurs for concentrated systems with thick double layer. This allows introduction of so-called "quasi-homogeneous" approach, when overlapped diffuse layers of particles cover the complete interparticle space. The theory becomes much simplified in this extreme case, as shown by Shilov and others. Their derivation predicts that surface charge density σ is a better parameter than ζ-potential for characterizing electroacoustic phenomena in such systems. An expression for CVI simplified for small particles follows:

$$\ CVI = A\frac{2{\sigma}a}{3\eta}\frac{\phi}{1-\phi}\frac{\rho_p-\rho_s}{\rho_s}$$

== See also ==
- Interface and colloid science
