= Surface conductivity =

Surface conductivity is an additional conductivity of an electrolyte in the vicinity of the charged interfaces. Surface and volume conductivity of liquids correspond to the electrically driven motion of ions in an electric field. A layer of counter ions of the opposite polarity to the surface charge exists close to the interface. It is formed due to attraction of counter-ions by the surface charges. This layer of higher ionic concentration is a part of the interfacial double layer. The concentration of the ions in this layer is higher as compared to the ionic strength of the liquid bulk. This leads to the higher electric conductivity of this layer.

Smoluchowski was the first to recognize the importance of surface conductivity at the beginning of the 20th century.

There is a detailed description of surface conductivity by Lyklema in "Fundamentals of Interface and Colloid Science"

The Double Layer (DL) has two regions, according to the well established Gouy-Chapman-Stern model. The upper level, which is in contact with the bulk liquid is the diffuse layer. The inner layer that is in contact with interface is the Stern layer.

It is possible that the lateral motion of ions in both parts of the DL contributes to the surface conductivity.

The contribution of the Stern layer is less well described. It is often called "additional surface conductivity".

The theory of the surface conductivity of the diffuse part of the DL was developed by Bikerman. He derived a simple equation that links surface conductivity κ^{σ} with the behaviour of ions at the interface. For symmetrical electrolyte and assuming identical ions diffusion coefficients D^{+}=D^{−}=D it is given in the reference:

$${\kappa}^{\sigma} = \frac{4F^2Cz^2D(1+3m/z^2)}{RT\kappa}\left(\cosh\frac{zF\zeta}{2RT}-1\right)$$

where

F is the Faraday constant
T is the absolute temperature
R is the gas constant
C is the ionic concentration in the bulk fluid
z is the ion valency
ζ is the electrokinetic potential

The parameter m characterizes the contribution of electro-osmosis to the motion of ions within the DL:

$$m = \frac{2\varepsilon_0\varepsilon_m R^2T^2}{3\eta F^2 D}$$

The Dukhin number is a dimensionless parameter that characterizes the contribution of the surface conductivity to a variety of electrokinetic phenomena, such as, electrophoresis and electroacoustic phenomena.

== See also ==
- Interface and Colloid Science

== Surface science ==
Surface conductivity may refer to the electrical conduction across a solid surface measured by surface probes. Experiments may be done to test this material property as in the n-type surface conductivity of p-type. Additionally, surface conductivity is measured in coupled phenomena such as photoconductivity, for example, for the metal oxide semiconductor ZnO. Surface conductivity differs from bulk conductivity for analogous reasons to the electrolyte solution case, where the charge carriers of holes (+1) and electrons (-1) play the role of ions in solution.
