= Electrophoresis (disambiguation) =

Electrophoresis is the motion of charged dispersed particles or dissolved charged molecules relative to a fluid under the influence of a spatially uniform electric field. As a rule, these zwitterionic particles and molecules have either a positive or negative net charge, which is often characterized with zeta potential.

"Electrophoresis" can also refer to:

== Interface and colloid science ==
- Dielectrophoresis, similar motion in a space non-uniform electric field
- Microelectrophoresis, a method of studying electrophoresis of various dispersed particles using optical microscopy
- Electrophoretic light scattering, a method for measuring electrophoretic mobility based on dynamic light scattering

== Molecular biology and biochemistry ==
- Affinity electrophoresis, used to separate and characterize biomolecules on basis of their molecular characteristics through binding to another biomolecule
- Capillary electrophoresis, commonly used to separate biomolecules by their charge and frictional forces
- Gel electrophoresis, a technique used by scientists to separate molecules based on physical characteristics such as size, shape, or isoelectric point
  - electrophoresis of nucleic acids, a specific type of gel electrophoresis used to analyse DNA and RNA
  - electrophoresis of proteins, a specific type of gel electrophoresis used to analyse proteins
  - SDS-PAGE, sodium dodecyl sulfate polyacrylamide gel electrophoresis, commonly used to analyse proteins
  - two-dimensional electrophoresis, a specific type of gel electrophoresis commonly used to analyse proteins which involves two separation mechanisms to separate molecules
- Immunoelectrophoresis, used to separate and characterize biomolecules on basis their molecular characteristics as well as binding of antibodies

== Medicine ==
- Iontophoresis, a way of rapidly administering drugs through the skin

== Media support ==
- Electrophoretic display, a device that displays media contents using charged pigment particles in an applied electric field

== Other ==
- Electrophoresis (journal)
