= Zeta potential titration =

Zeta potential titration is a titration of heterogeneous systems, for example colloids and emulsions. Solids in such systems have very high surface area. This type of titration is used to study the zeta potential of these surfaces under different conditions. Details of zeta potential definition and measuring techniques can be found in the International Standard and recent book published by Elsevier

Zeta potential titrations of concentrated alumina and rutile dispersions

== Iso-electric Point ==
The iso-electric point is one such property. The iso-electric point is the pH value at which the zeta potential is approximately zero. At a pH near the iso-electric point (± 2 pH units), colloids are usually unstable; the particles tend to coagulate or flocculate. Such titrations use acids or bases as titration reagents. Tables of iso-electric points for different materials are available. The attached figure illustrates results of such titrations for concentrated dispersions of alumina (4% v/v) and rutile (7% v/v). It is seen that iso-electric point of alumina is around pH 9.3, whereas for rutile it is around pH 4. Alumina is unstable in the pH range from 7 to 11. Rutile is unstable in the pH range from 2 to 6.

== Surfactants and Stabilization ==
Another purpose of this titration is determination of the optimum dose of surfactant for achieving stabilization or flocculation of a heterogeneous system.

== Measurement ==
In a zeta-potential titration, the Zeta potential is the indicator. Measurement of the zeta potential can be performed using microelectrophoresis, or electrophoretic light scattering, or electroacoustic phenomena. The last method makes possible to perform titrations in concentrated systems, with no dilution.
