= Dynamic electrophoretic mobility =

Dynamic electrophoretic mobility is a parameter that determines intensity of electroacoustic phenomena, such as Colloid Vibration Current and Electric Sonic Amplitude in colloids ]. It is similar to electrophoretic mobility, but at high frequency, on a scale of megahertz. Usual electrophoretic mobility is the low frequency limit of the dynamic electrophoretic mobility.

== History ==
Notion of dynamic electrophoretic mobility was introduced by R. O’Brien in late 20th century. This initial theory was valid only for sufficiently dilute dispersions. It was extended to concentrated dispersions using cell model and proper selection of the frame of references for describing particles motion in liquid by A. Dukhin, V. Shilov and others in serial of papers overviewed in the book.

== Measurement ==
The value of dynamic electrophoretic mobility is usually measured using various electroacoustic devices. There is International Standard ISO 13099-3 that described principles of such devices functioning
