= Colloid vibration current =

Colloid vibration current is an electroacoustic phenomenon that arises when ultrasound propagates through a fluid that contains ions and either solid particles or emulsion droplets.

The pressure gradient in an ultrasonic wave moves particles relative to the fluid. This motion disturbs the double layer that exists at the particle-fluid interface. The picture illustrates the mechanism of this distortion. Practically all particles in fluids carry a surface charge. This surface charge is screened with an equally charged diffuse layer; this structure is called the double layer. Ions of the diffuse layer are located in the fluid and can move with the fluid. Fluid motion relative to the particle drags these diffuse ions in the direction of one or the other of the particle's poles. The picture shows ions dragged towards the left hand pole. As a result of this drag, there is an excess of negative ions in the vicinity of the left hand pole and an excess of positive surface charge at the right hand pole. As a result of this charge excess, particles gain a dipole moment. These dipole moments generate an electric field that in turn generates measurable electric current. This phenomenon is widely used for measuring zeta potential in concentrated colloids.

== See also ==
- Electric sonic amplitude
- Electroacoustic phenomena
- Interface and colloid science
- Zeta potential
