= Microelectrophoresis =

Microscopy of dispersed particles moving in a uniform electric field

Microelectrophoresis is a method of studying electrophoresis of various dispersed particles using optical microscopy. This method provides image of moving particles, which is its unique advantage. e.g. observation of RBCs, neutrophiles and bacteria. This type of electrophoresis is carried out in a closed medium with critical observations made by focusing and adjusting the lens of the microscope.

Complexity of this method is associated with electro-osmosis generated by electric field influence on the double layers of the sample cell walls. In the usually used closed cells, this creates Poiseuille-type back flow, leading to parabolic velocity profile. There are two stationary layers, where fluid does not move. The position of these stationary layers regarding cell walls depends on the cell geometry. It is possible to focus microscope on these stationary layers and observe particle motion that is not affected by electro-osmosis.

The second complexity comes from necessity of diluting sample, if it was initially concentrated. Concentration must be sufficiently low for observing individual particles.

Measurement in the low polar fluids presents additional problems. These systems have low electrical conductivity and low dielectric permittivity. Electrophoretic mobility is low and this requires high electric field, by factor 10 or higher.

Details of this method are presented in IUPAC Technical Report prepared by a group of most known world experts on the electrokinetic phenomena.
