= Cationization of cotton =

Chemical process

The cationization of cotton is an electrokinetic process for surface-charging cotton with negative ions. Cationization alters the characterization of the surface of the cotton, which allows salt-free dyeing and improves the dyeability of cotton. The process involves the chemical reaction of cationic reactive agents with cellulose.

== Methods of cationization ==
Cationization involves the modification of cellulosic macromolecules that have positively charged sites, by using a chemical reaction with cationic reagents; for example, with a quaternary ammonium cation or using (3-chloro-2-hydroxylpropyl) trimethyl-ammonium chloride (CHPTAC).

== Advantages ==
Cotton possesses a negative surface charge, while reactive and direct dyes also carry a negative charge. The like charges repel each other, and the addition of salt aids in dyeing by generating a positive charge on the cotton surface. The industry has predominantly used reactive dyes to color knitted cotton goods. The treatment of salt-laden, colored effluent generated by the dyeing process is one of the industry's primary concerns. Cotton cationization is one of the most effective solutions to the aforementioned problem.

Cationization of cotton enables salt-free dyeing and enhances the dyeability of the substrate with anionic dyes such as reactive dyes and direct dyes. Water and salt consumption are one of the major problems in dyeing, especially of cotton, which leads to substantial environmental impact with extra time and cost. Secondly, washing off the residual salt is also important for washing-fastness properties, which needs more washing baths. Cationization of cotton reduces the effluent, TDS load, and water consumption in comparison to the conventional dyeing processes.

== See also ==
- Quaternary ammonium cation
