= Zeta potential =

Electrokinetic potential in colloidal dispersions

Diagram showing the ionic concentration and potential difference as a function of distance from the charged surface of a particle suspended in a dispersion medium

Zeta potential is the electrical potential at the slipping plane. This plane is the interface which separates mobile fluid from fluid that remains attached to the surface.

Zeta potential is a scientific term for electrokinetic potential in colloidal dispersions. In the colloidal chemistry literature, it is usually denoted using the Greek letter zeta (ζ), hence ζ-potential. The usual units are volts (V) or, more commonly, millivolts (mV). From a theoretical viewpoint, the zeta potential is the electric potential in the interfacial double layer (DL) at the location of the slipping plane relative to a point in the bulk fluid away from the interface. In other words, zeta potential is the potential difference between the dispersion medium and the stationary layer of fluid attached to the dispersed particle.

The zeta potential is caused by the net electrical charge contained within the region bounded by the slipping plane, and also depends on the location of that plane. Thus, it is widely used for quantification of the magnitude of the charge. However, zeta potential is not equal to the Stern potential or electric surface potential in the double layer, because these are defined at different locations. Such assumptions of equality should be applied with caution. Nevertheless, zeta potential is often the only available path for characterization of double-layer properties.

The zeta potential is an important and readily measurable indicator of the stability of colloidal dispersions. The magnitude of the zeta potential indicates the degree of electrostatic repulsion between adjacent, similarly charged particles in a dispersion. For molecules and particles that are small enough, a high zeta potential will confer stability, i.e., the solution or dispersion will resist aggregation. When the potential is small, attractive forces may exceed this repulsion and the dispersion may break and flocculate. So, colloids with high zeta potential (negative or positive) are electrically stabilized while colloids with low zeta potentials tend to coagulate or flocculate as outlined in the table.

Zeta potential can also be used for the pKa estimation of complex polymers that is otherwise difficult to measure accurately using conventional methods. This can help studying the ionisation behaviour of various synthetic and natural polymers under various conditions and can help in establishing standardised dissolution-pH thresholds for pH responsive polymers.

Stability behaviour of a colloid depending on zeta potential
Magnitude of Zeta potential (mV)	Stability behavior
0 to 5	Rapid coagulation or flocculation
10 to 30	Incipient instability
30 to 40	Moderate stability
40 to 60	Good stability
>61	Excellent stability

== Measurement ==
There are several methods for measuring zeta potential described in ISO Standards. These documents contain detail description of procedures for measuring electrophoretic mobility and dynamic electrophoretic mobility, which serve as raw experimental data for further calculating zeta potential. They also include general overview of theoretical models required for calculating zeta potential from the measured raw data.

=== Electrokinetic phenomena ===
Electrophoresis is used for estimating zeta potential of particulates, whereas streaming potential/current is used for porous bodies and flat surfaces. In practice, the zeta potential of dispersion is measured by applying an electric field across the dispersion. Particles within the dispersion with a zeta potential will migrate toward the electrode of opposite charge with a velocity proportional to the magnitude of the zeta potential.

This velocity is measured using the technique of the laser Doppler anemometer. The frequency shift or phase shift of an incident laser beam caused by these moving particles is measured as the particle mobility, and this mobility is converted to the zeta potential by inputting the dispersant viscosity and dielectric permittivity, and the application of the Smoluchowski theories.

==== Electrophoresis ====
Electrophoretic mobility is proportional to electrophoretic velocity, which is the measurable parameter. There are several theories that link electrophoretic mobility with zeta potential. They are briefly described in the article on electrophoresis and in details in many books on colloid and interface science. There is an IUPAC Technical Report prepared by a group of world experts on the electrokinetic phenomena. From the instrumental viewpoint, there are three different experimental techniques: microelectrophoresis, electrophoretic light scattering, and tunable resistive pulse sensing. Microelectrophoresis has the advantage of yielding an image of the moving particles. On the other hand, it is complicated by electro-osmosis at the walls of the sample cell. Electrophoretic light scattering is based on dynamic light scattering. It allows measurement in an open cell which eliminates the problem of electro-osmotic flow except for the case of a capillary cell. And, it can be used to characterize very small particles, but at the price of the lost ability to display images of moving particles. Tunable resistive pulse sensing (TRPS) is an impedance-based measurement technique that measures the zeta potential of individual particles based on the duration of the resistive pulse signal. The translocation duration of nanoparticles is measured as a function of voltage and applied pressure. From the inverse translocation time versus voltage-dependent electrophoretic mobility, and thus zeta potentials are calculated. The main advantage of the TRPS method is that it allows for simultaneous size and surface charge measurements on a particle-by-particle basis, enabling the analysis of a wide spectrum of synthetic and biological nano/microparticles and their mixtures.

All these measuring techniques may require dilution of the sample. Sometimes this dilution might affect properties of the sample and change zeta potential. There is only one justified way to perform this dilution – by using equilibrium supernatant. In this case, the interfacial equilibrium between the surface and the bulk liquid would be maintained and zeta potential would be the same for all volume fractions of particles in the suspension. When the diluent is known (as is the case for a chemical formulation), additional diluent can be prepared. If the diluent is unknown, equilibrium supernatant is readily obtained by centrifugation.

==== Streaming potential, streaming current ====
The streaming potential is an electric potential that develops during the flow of liquid through a capillary. In nature, a streaming potential may occur at a significant magnitude in areas with volcanic activities. The streaming potential is also the primary electrokinetic phenomenon for the assessment of the zeta potential at the solid material-water interface. A corresponding solid sample is arranged in such a way to form a capillary flow channel. Materials with a flat surface are mounted as duplicate samples that are aligned as parallel plates. The sample surfaces are separated by a small distance to form a capillary flow channel. Materials with an irregular shape, such as fibers or granular media, are mounted as a porous plug to provide a pore network, which serves as capillaries for the streaming potential measurement. Upon the application of pressure on a test solution, liquid starts to flow and to generate an electric potential. This streaming potential is related to the pressure gradient between the ends of either a single flow channel (for samples with a flat surface) or the porous plug (for fibers and granular media) to calculate the surface zeta potential.

Alternatively to the streaming potential, the measurement of streaming current offers another approach to the surface zeta potential. Most commonly, the classical equations derived by Maryan Smoluchowski are used to convert streaming potential or streaming current results into the surface zeta potential.

Applications of the streaming potential and streaming current method for the surface zeta potential determination consist of the characterization of surface charge of polymer membranes, biomaterials and medical devices, and minerals.

=== Electroacoustic phenomena ===
There are two electroacoustic effects that are widely used for characterizing zeta potential: colloid vibration current and electric sonic amplitude. There are commercially available instruments that exploit these effects for measuring dynamic electrophoretic mobility, which depends on zeta potential.

Electroacoustic techniques have the advantage of being able to perform measurements in intact samples, without dilution. Published and well-verified theories allow such measurements at volume fractions up to 50%. Calculation of zeta potential from the dynamic electrophoretic mobility requires information on the densities for particles and liquid. In addition, for larger particles exceeding roughly 300 nm in size information on the particle size required as well.

== Calculation ==
The most known and widely used theory for calculating zeta potential from experimental data is that developed by Marian Smoluchowski in 1903. Smoluchowski's theory is powerful because it is valid for dispersed particles of any shape and any concentration. However, it has its limitations:

- Detailed theoretical analysis proved that Smoluchowski's theory is valid only for a sufficiently thin double layer, when the Debye length, $1/\kappa$, is much smaller than the particle radius, $a$:
  $${\kappa} \cdot a \gg 1$$
  The model of the "thin double layer" offers tremendous simplifications not only for electrophoresis theory but for many other electrokinetic and electroacoustic theories. This model is valid for most aqueous systems because the Debye length is typically only a few nanometers in water. The model breaks only for nano-colloids in a solution with ionic strength approaching that of pure water.
- Smoluchowski's theory neglects the contribution of surface conductivity. This is expressed in modern theories as the condition of a small Dukhin number:
  $$Du \ll 1$$

The development of electrophoretic and electroacoustic theories with a wider range of validity was a purpose of many studies during the 20th century. There are several analytical theories that incorporate surface conductivity and eliminate the restriction of the small Dukhin number for both the electrokinetic and electroacoustic applications.

Early pioneering work in that direction dates back to Overbeek and Booth.

Modern, rigorous electrokinetic theories that are valid for any zeta potential, and often any $\kappa a$, stem mostly from Soviet Ukrainian (Dukhin, Shilov, and others) and Australian (O'Brien, White, Hunter, and others) schools. Historically, the first one was Dukhin–Semenikhin theory. A similar theory was created ten years later by O'Brien and Hunter. Assuming a thin double layer, these theories would yield results that are very close to the numerical solution provided by O'Brien and White. There are also general electroacoustic theories that are valid for any values of Debye length and Dukhin number.

=== Henry's equation ===
When κa is between large values where simple analytical models are available, and low values where numerical calculations are valid, Henry's equation can be used when the zeta potential is low. For a nonconducting sphere, Henry's equation is $u_e= \frac{2\varepsilon_{rs} \varepsilon_0}{3\eta} \zeta f_1(\kappa a)$, where f_{1} is the Henry function, one of a collection of functions which vary smoothly from 1.0 to 1.5 as κa approaches infinity.
