= Ion vibration current =

The ion vibration current (IVI) and the associated ion vibration potential is an electric signal that arises when an acoustic wave propagates through a homogeneous fluid.

Historically, the IVI was the first known electroacoustic phenomenon. It was predicted by Peter Debye in 1933.

When a longitudinal sound wave travels through a solvent, the associated pressure gradients push the fluid particles back and forth, and it is easy in practice to create such accelerations that measure thousands or millions of g's. If a solute molecule is more dense or less dense than the surrounding liquid, then in this accelerating environment, the molecule will move relative to the surrounding liquid. This relative motion is essentially the same phenomenon that occurs in a centrifuge, or more simply, it is essentially the same phenomenon that occurs when low-density objects float to the top of a glass of water, and high-density particles sink to the bottom (see the equivalence principle, which states that gravity is just like any other acceleration). The amount of relative motion depends on the balance between the molecule's effective mass (which includes both the mass of the molecule itself and any solvent molecules that are so tightly bound to the molecule that they follow along with the molecule's motion), its effective volume (related to buoyant force), and the viscous drag (friction) between the molecule and the surrounding fluid.

IVI concerns the case where the particles in question are anions and cations. In general, they will have different amounts of motion relative to the fluid during the sound wave oscillations, and that discrepancy creates an alternating electric potential between various points in a sound wave.

This effect was extensively used in the 1950s and 1960s for characterizing ion solvation. These works are mostly associated with the names of Zana and Yaeger, who published a review of their studies in 1982.

== See also ==
- Interface and colloid science
