= Electrophoretic light scattering =

Electrophoretic light scattering (also known as laser Doppler electrophoresis and phase analysis light scattering ) is based on dynamic light scattering. The frequency shift or phase shift of an incident laser beam depends on the dispersed particles mobility. With dynamic light scattering, Brownian motion causes particle motion. With electrophoretic light scattering, oscillating electric field performs this function.

The method is used for measuring electrophoretic mobility, from which zeta potential can then be calculated. Instruments for applying the method are commercially available from several manufacturers. The last set of calculations requires information on viscosity and dielectric permittivity of the dispersion medium; appropriate electrophoresis theory is also required. Sample dilution is often necessary to eliminate multiple scattering of the incident laser beam and/or particle interactions.

== Instrumentation ==
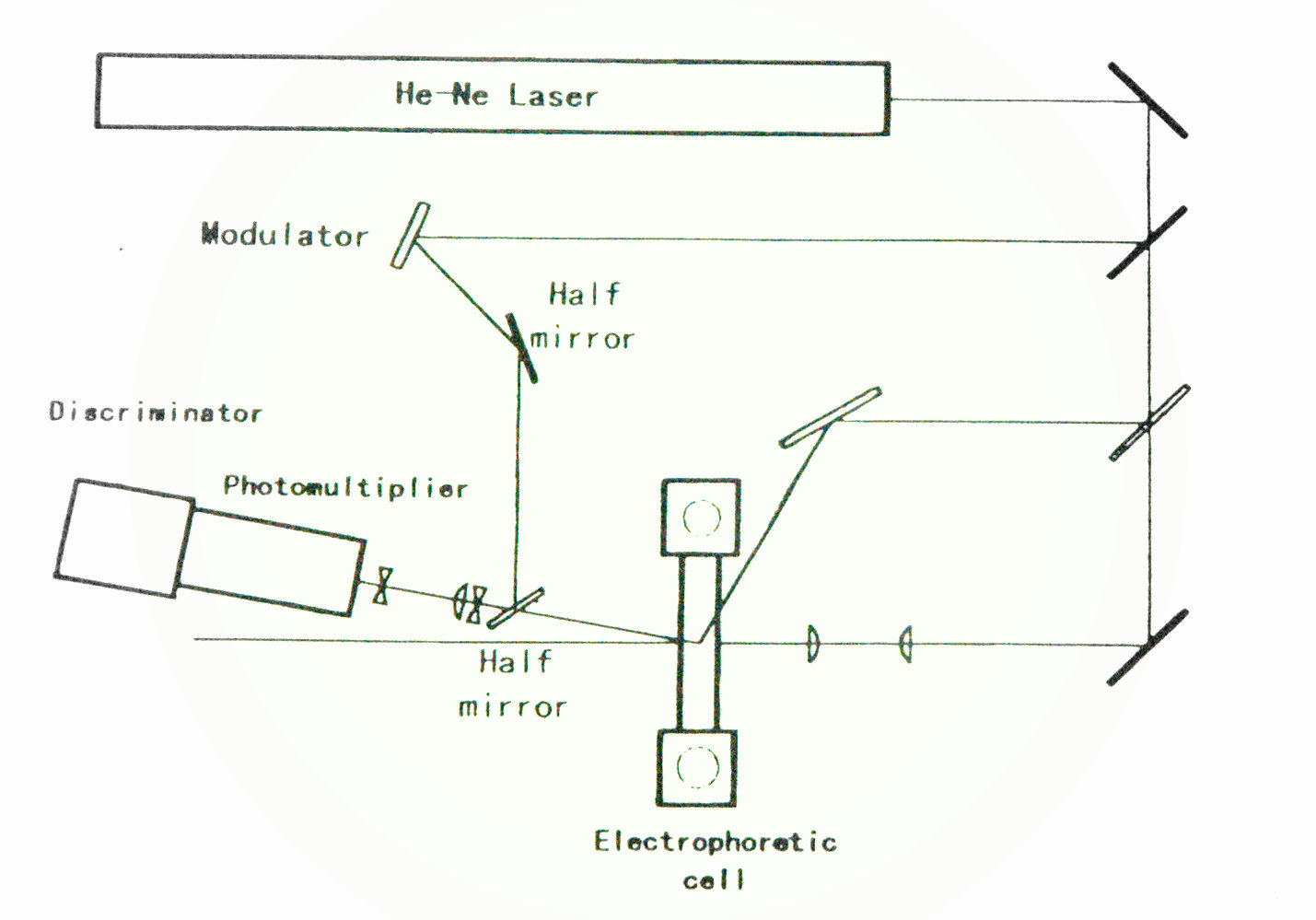
Fig.3. Commercial heterodyne optical system of an electrophoretic light scattering instrument with a modulator (from Ref. 11).

A laser beam passes through the electrophoresis cell, irradiates the particles dispersed in it, and is scattered by the particles. The scattered light is detected by a photo-multiplier after passing through two pinholes. There are two types of optical systems: heterodyne and fringe. Ware and Flygare developed a heterodyne-type ELS instrument, that was the first instrument of this type. In a fringe optics ELS instrument, a laser beam is divided into two beams. Those cross inside the electrophoresis cell at a fixed angle to produce a fringe pattern. The scattered light from the particles, which migrates inside the fringe, is intensity-modulated. The frequency shifts from both types of optics obey the same equations. The observed spectra resemble each other. Oka et al. developed an ELS instrument of heterodyne-type optics that is now available commercially. Its optics is shown in Fig. 3.

If the frequencies of the intersecting laser beams are the same then it is not possible to resolve the direction of the motion of the migrating particles. Instead, only the magnitude of the velocity (i.e., the speed) can be determined. Hence, the sign of the zeta potential cannot be ascertained. This limitation can be overcome by shifting the frequency of one of the beams relative to the other. Such shifting may be referred to as frequency modulation or, more colloquially, just modulation. Modulators used in ELS may include piezo-actuated mirrors or acousto-optic modulators. This modulation scheme is employed by the heterodyne light scattering method, too.

Phase-analysis light scattering (PALS) is a method for evaluating zeta potential, in which the rate of phase change of the interference between light scattered by the sample and the modulated reference beam is analyzed. This rate is compared with a mathematically generated sine wave predetermined by the modulator frequency. The application of large fields, which can lead to sample heating and breakdown of the colloids is no longer required. But any non-linearity of the modulator or any change in the characteristics of the modulator with time will mean that the generated sine wave will no longer reflect the real conditions, and the resulting zeta-potential measurements become less reliable.

A further development of the PALS technique is the so-called "continuously monitored PALS" (cmPALS) technique, which addresses the non-linearity of the modulators. An extra modulator detects the interference between the modulated and unmodulated laser light. Thus, its beat frequency is solely the modulation frequency and is therefore independent of the electrophoretic motion of the particles. This results in faster measurements, higher reproducibility even at low applied electric fields as well as higher sensitivity of the measurement.

== Heterodyne light scattering ==
The frequency of light scattered by particles undergoing electrophoresis is shifted by the amount of the Doppler effect, $\upsilon_D\,$ from that of the incident light, :$\upsilon\,$ . The shift can be detected by means of heterodyne optics in which the scattering light is mixed with the reference light. The autocorrelation function of intensity of the mixed light, $g(\tau) \,$, can be approximately described by the following damped cosine function [7].

$$g(\tau)=A+B \exp(-\Gamma\tau)\cos(2\pi\upsilon_o)+C \exp(-2\Gamma \tau)\,\qquad (1)$$

where $\Gamma\,$ is a decay constant and A, B, and C are positive constants dependent on the optical system.

Damping frequency $\upsilon_o\,$ is an observed frequency, and is the frequency difference between scattered and reference light.

$$\upsilon_o =| \upsilon_s - \upsilon_r   | = | (\upsilon_i+\upsilon_D)-(\upsilon_i+\upsilon_M ) |\qquad(2)$$

where $\upsilon_s\,$ is the frequency of scattered light, $\upsilon_r\,$ the frequency of the reference light, $\upsilon_i\,$ the frequency of incident light (laser light), and $\upsilon_M\,$ the modulation frequency.

The power spectrum of mixed light, namely the Fourier transform of $g(\tau) \,$, gives a couple of Lorenz functions at $\pm\Delta\upsilon \,$ having a half-width of $\Gamma/2\pi\,$ at the half maximum.

In addition to these two, the last term in equation (1) gives another Lorenz function at $\upsilon = 0\,$

The Doppler shift of frequency and the decay constant are dependent on the geometry of the optical system and are expressed respectively by the equations.

$$\upsilon_D = \frac{Vq}{2\pi} \qquad(3)$$

and

$$\Gamma = D|q|^2 \qquad(4)$$

where $\ V \,$ is velocity of the particles, $\ q \,$ is the amplitude of the scattering vector, and $\ D \,$ is the translational diffusion constant of particles.

The amplitude of the scattering vector $\ q \,$ is given by the equation

$$\  |q|  = \frac{4 \pi n}{\lambda_0 }\sin\left( \frac{\theta}{2}\right) \qquad(5)$$

Since velocity $\ V \,$ is proportional to the applied electric field, $\ E \,$, the apparent electrophoretic mobility $\ \mu_{obs} \,$ is define by the equation

$$\  \vec{V}  =  \mu_{obs} \vec{E}  \qquad(6)$$

Finally, the relation between the Doppler shift frequency and mobility is given for the case of the optical configuration of Fig. 3 by the equation

$$\upsilon_D = \mu_{obs} \frac{n E}{\lambda_0} \sin \theta \qquad(7)$$

where $\ E \,$ is the strength of the electric field, $\ n\,$ the refractive index of the medium, $\ \lambda_0 \,$, the wavelength of the incident light in vacuum, and $\ \theta \,$ the scattering angle. The sign of $\ v_D \,$ is a result of vector calculation and depends on the geometry of the optics.

The spectral frequency can be obtained according to Eq. (2). When $\ | \upsilon_M | > | \upsilon _D | \,$, Eq. (2) is modified and expressed as

$$\upsilon_p = \upsilon_o = \pm( \upsilon _D -| \upsilon _M | ) \qquad(8)$$

The modulation frequency $\upsilon _M \,$ can be obtained as the damping frequency without an electric field applied.

The particle diameter is obtained by assuming that the particle is spherical. This is called the hydrodynamic diameter, $\ d_H\,$ .

$$\ d_H =  \frac{k_BT}{3 \pi  \eta D} \qquad(10)$$

where $\ k_B \,$ is Boltzmann coefficient, $\ T \,$ is the absolute temperature, and $\ \eta \,$ the dynamic viscosity of the surrounding fluid.

== Profile of electro-osmotic flow ==
Figure 4 shows two examples of heterodyne autocorrelation functions of scattered light from sodium polystyrene sulfate solution (NaPSS; MW 400,000; 4 mg/mL in 10 mM NaCl). The oscillating correlation function shown by Fig. 4a is a result of interference between the scattered light and the modulated reference light. The beat of Fig. 4b includes additionally the contribution from the frequency changes of light scattered by PSS molecules under an electrical field of 40 V/cm.

Figure 5 shows heterodyne power spectra obtained by Fourier transform of the autocorrelation functions shown in Fig. 4.

Figure 6 shows plots of Doppler shift frequencies measured at various cell depth and electric field strengths, where a sample is the NaPSS solution. These parabolic curves are called profiles of electro-osmotic flow and indicate that the velocity of the particles changed at different depth. The surface potential of the cell wall produces electro-osmotic flow. Since the electrophoresis chamber is a closed system, backward flow is produced at the center of the cell. Then the observed mobility or velocity from Eq. (7) is a result of the combination of osmotic flow and electrophoretic movement.

Electrophoretic mobility analysis has been studied by Mori and Okamoto [16], who have taken into account the effect of electro-osmotic flow at the side wall.

The profile of velocity or mobility at the center of the cell is given approximately by Eq. (11) for the case where k>5.

$$\ U_a (z) = AU_0(z/b)^2 + \Delta U_0(z/b)+(1-A) U_0 + U_p \qquad(11)$$

where

$\ z = \,$ cell depth
$\ U_a (z) = \,$ apparent electrophoretic velocity of particle at position z.

$\ U_p = \,$ true electrophoretic velocity of the particles.

$\ z/b = \,$ thickness of the cell

$\ U_0 = \,$ average velocity of osmotic flow at upper and lower cell wall.

$\Delta U_0 = \,$ difference between velocities of osmotic flow at upper and lower cell wall.

$$\ A = \frac{1}{( 2/3) - (0.420166/k)} \qquad(12)$$
$\ k = a/b \,$ , a ratio between two side lengths of the rectangular cross section.

The parabolic curve of frequency shift caused by electro-osmotic flow shown in Fig. 6 fits with Eq. (11) with application of the least squares method.

Since the mobility is proportional to a frequency shift of the light scattered by a particle and the migrating velocity of a particle as indicated by Eq. (7), all the velocity, mobility, and frequency shifts are expressed by parabolic equations. Then the true electrophoretic mobility of a particle, the electro-osmotic mobility at the upper and lower cell walls, ware obtained. The frequency shift caused only by the electrophoresis of particles is equal to the apparent mobility at the stationary layer.

The velocity of the electrophoretic migration thus obtained is proportional to the electric field as shown in Fig. 7. The frequency shift increases with increase of the scattering angle as shown in Fig. 8. This result is in agreement with the theoretical Eq. (7).

Fig.4 a and b; Correlation function with and without electric field. Sample: NaPSS solution (MW: 400,000) of 4 mg/ml in 10 mM NaCl. Electric field applied: (a) 0 V/cm; (b) 40 V/cm. Scattering angle 7.0 degree, temperature 25 +-0.3

Fig. 5. Heterodyne power spectra obtained by FFT of the correlation functions.

Fig. 6. Frequency shifts observed at various cell depths.

Fig. 7. Electric field dependence of the velocity at the stationary layer.

Fig. 8. Frequency shift as a function of scattering angle.

== Applications ==
Electrophoretic light scattering (ELS) is primarily used for characterizing the surface charges of colloidal particles like macromolecules or synthetic polymers (ex. polystyrene) in liquid media in an electric field. In addition to information about surface charges, ELS can also measure the particle size of proteins and determine the zeta potential distribution.

=== Biophysics ===
ELS is useful for characterizing information about the surface of proteins. Ware and Flygare (1971) demonstrated that electrophoretic techniques can be combined with laser beat spectroscopy in order to simultaneously determine the electrophoretic mobility and diffusion coefficient of bovine serum albumin. The width of a Doppler shifted spectrum of light that is scattered from a solution of macromolecules is proportional to the diffusion coefficient. The Doppler shift is proportional to the electrophoretic mobility of a macromolecule. From studies that have applied this method to poly (L-lysine), ELS is believed to monitor fluctuation mobilities in the presence of solvents with varying salt concentrations. It has also been shown that electrophoretic mobility data can be converted to zeta potential values, which enables the determination of the isoelectric point of proteins and the number of electrokinetic charges on the surface.

Other biological macromolecules that can be analyzed with ELS include polysaccharides. pKa values of chitosans can be calculated from the dependency of electrophoretic mobility values on pH and charge density. Like proteins, the size and zeta potential of chitosans can be determined through ELS.

ELS has also been applied to nucleic acids and viruses. The technique can be extended to measure electrophoretic mobilities of large bacteria molecules at low ionic strengths.

=== Nanoparticles ===
ELS has been used to characterize the polydispersity, nanodispersity, and stability of single-walled carbon nanotubes in an aqueous environment with surfactants. The technique can be used in combination with dynamic light scattering to measure these properties of nanotubes in many different solvents.
