= Interface force field =

In the context of chemistry and molecular modelling, the Interface force field (IFF) is a force field for classical molecular simulations of atoms, molecules, and assemblies up to the large nanometer scale, covering compounds from across the periodic table. It employs a consistent classical Hamiltonian energy function for metals, oxides, and organic compounds, linking biomolecular and materials simulation platforms into a single platform. The reliability is often higher than that of density functional theory calculations at more than a million times lower computational cost. IFF includes a physical-chemical interpretation for all parameters as well as a surface model database that covers different cleavage planes and surface chemistry of included compounds. The Interface Force Field is compatible with force fields for the simulation of primarily organic compounds and can be used with common molecular dynamics and Monte Carlo codes. Structures and energies of included chemical elements and compounds are rigorously validated and property predictions are up to a factor of 100 more accurate relative to earlier models.

== Origin ==
IFF was developed by Hendrik Heinz and his research group in 2013, based on preliminary work dating back to 2003 that includes a new rationale for atomic charges, use of energy expressions, interpretation of parameters, and a series of outperforming force field parameters for minerals, metals, and polymers. The force fields covered new chemical space and were one to two orders of magnitude more accurate than prior models where available, with apparently no restrictions to extend them further across the periodic table.

As early as in the late 1960s, interatomic potentials were developed, for example, for amino acids and later served the CHARMM program. The fraction of covered chemical space was small, however, considering the size of the periodic table, and compatible interatomic potentials for inorganic compounds remained largely unavailable. Different energy functions, lack of interpretation and validation of parameters restricted modeling to isolated compounds with unpredictable errors. Assumptions of formal charges, a lack of rationale for Lennard-Jones parameters and even for bonded terms, fixed atoms, as well as other approximations often led to collapsed structures and random energy differences when allowing atom mobility. A concept for consistent simulations of inorganic-organic interfaces, that formed the basis of IFF, was first introduced in 2003.

A major obstacle was the poor definition of atomic charges in molecular models, especially for inorganic compounds, due to reliance on quantum chemistry calculations and partitioning methods that may be suitable for field-based but not for point-based charge distributions necessary in force fields. As a result, uncertainties in quantum-mechanically derived point charges were often 100% or higher, clearly unsuited to quantify chemical bonding or chemical processes in force fields and in molecular simulations. IFF utilizes a method to assign atomic charges that translates chemical bonding accurately into molecular models, including metals, oxides, minerals, and organic molecules. The models reproduce multipole moments internal to a chemical compound on the basis of experimental data for electron deformation densities, dipole moments (often known to <1% error), as well as consideration of atomization energies, ionization energies, coordination numbers, and trends relative to other chemically similar compounds in the periodic table (the Extended Born Model). The method ensures a combination of experimental data and theory to represent chemical bonding and yields up to ten times more reliable and reproducible atomic charges in comparison to the use of quantum methods, with typical uncertainties of 5%. This approach is essential to carry out consistent all-atom simulations of compounds across the periodic table that vary widely in the type of chemical bonding and in internal polarity. IFF also allows the inclusion of specific features of the electronic structure such as π electrons in graphitic materials and aromatic compounds as well as image charges in metals.

Another distinctive characteristic of IFF is the systematic reproduction of structures and energies to validate the classical Hamiltonian. First, the quality of structural predictions is assessed by validation of lattice parameters and densities from X-ray data, which has been common in molecular simulations. Second, in addition, IFF uses surface and cleavage energies for solids from experimental measurements to ensure a reliable potential energy surface. Third, in addition, force field parameters and reference data are considered at standard temperature and pressure. This protocol is far more practical than using lattice parameters at a temperature of 0 K and cohesive (vaporization) energies at up to 3000 K, which is commonly the case to assess ab-initio calculations, as then the conditions are far from practical utility and experimental data for validation may be limited or not at all available. As a result of the advances in IFF, hydration energies, adsorption energies, thermal, and mechanical properties can often be computed in quantitative agreement with measurements without further parameter modifications. The IFF parameters also have a physical-chemical interpretation and allow chemical analogy as an effective method to derive parameters for chemically similar, yet not parameterized compounds in good accuracy.

Alternative approaches based on gray-box or black-box fitting of force field parameters, e.g., using lattice parameters and mechanical properties (the 2nd derivative of the energy) as target quantities, lack interpretability and frequently incur 50% to 500% error in surface and interfacial energies, which is usually not sufficient to accelerate materials design.

== Current coverage ==
IFF covers metals, oxides, 2D materials, cement minerals, and organic compounds. The typical accuracy is ~0.5% for lattice parameters, ~5% for surface energies, and ~10% for elastic moduli, including documented variations for individual compounds. All-atom models and simulation inputs for bulk materials and interfaces can be built using Materials Studio, VMD, LAMMPS, CHARMM-GUI, as well as other editing programs. Simulations and analysis can be carried out using many molecular dynamics programs such as Discover, Forcite, LAMMPS, NAMD, GROMACS, and CHARMM. IFF uses employs the same potential energy function as other common force fields (CHARMM, AMBER, OPLS-AA, CVFF, DREIDING, GROMOS, PCFF, COMPASS), including options for 12-6 and 9-6 Lennard-Jones potentials, and can be used standalone or as a plugin to these force fields to utilize existing parameters.

== Applications ==
Accurate interatomic potentials are essential to analyze assemblies of atoms, molecules, and nanostructures up to the small microscale. IFF is used in molecular dynamics simulations of nanomaterials and biological interfaces. Structures up to ten thousands of atoms can be analyzed on a workstation, and up to a billion atoms using supercomputing. Examples include properties of metals and alloys, mineral-organic interfaces, protein- and DNA-nanomaterial interactions, earth and building materials, carbon nanostructures, batteries, and polymer composites. The simulations visualize atomically resolved processes and quantify relationships to macroscale properties that are elusive from experiments due to limitations in imaging and tracking of atoms. Modeling thereby complements experimental studies by X-ray diffraction, electron microscopy and tomography, such as transmission electron microscopy and atomic force microscopy, as well as several types of spectroscopy, calorimetry, and electrochemical measurements. Knowledge of the 3D atomic structures and dynamic changes over time is key to understanding the function of sensors, molecular signatures of diseases, and material properties. Computations with IFF can also be used to screen large numbers of hypothetical materials for guidance in synthesis and processing.

== Surface model database ==
A database in IFF provides simulation-ready models of crystal structures and crystallographic surfaces of metals and minerals. Often, variable surface chemistry is important, such as in pH-responsive surfaces of silica, hydroxyapatite, and cement minerals. The model options in the database incorporate extensive experimental data, which can be selected and customized by users. For example, models for silica cover the flexible area density of silanol groups and siloxide groups according to data from differential thermal gravimetry, spectroscopy, zeta potentials, surface titration, and pK values. Similarly, hydroxyapatite minerals in bone and teeth displays surfaces that differ in dihydrogenphosphate versus monohydrogenphosphate content as a function of pH value. The surface chemistry is often as critical as good interatomic potentials to predict the dynamics of electrolyte interfaces, molecular recognition, and surface reactions.

== Application to chemical reactions ==
IFF is primarily a classical potential with limited applicability to chemical reactions. Quantitative simulations of reactions is, however, a natural extension due to an interpretable representation of chemical bonding and electronic structure. Simulations of the relative activity of Pd nanoparticle catalysts in C-C Stille coupling, hydration reactions, and cis-trans isomerization reactions of azobenzene have been reported. A general pathway to simulate reactions are QM/MM simulations. Other pathways to implement reactions are user-defined changes in bond connectivity during the simulations, and use of a Morse potential instead of a harmonic bond potential to enable bond breaking in stress-strain simulations.
