= Differential capacitance =

Differential capacitance in physics, electronics, and electrochemistry is a measure of the voltage-dependent capacitance of a nonlinear capacitor, such as an electrical double layer or a semiconductor diode. It is defined as the derivative of charge with respect to potential.

== Description ==
In electrochemistry differential capacitance is a parameter introduced for characterizing electrical double layers:

$$C = \frac{\mathrm{d} \sigma}{ \mathrm{d} \psi}$$

where σ is surface charge and ψ is electric surface potential.

Capacitance is usually defined as the stored charge between two conducting surfaces separated by a dielectric divided by the voltage between the surfaces. Another definition is the rate of change of the stored charge or surface charge (σ) divided by the rate of change of the voltage between the surfaces or the electric surface potential (ψ). The latter is called the "differential capacitance", but usually the stored charge is directly proportional to the voltage, making the capacitances given by the two definitions equal.

This type of differential capacitance may be called "parallel plate capacitance", after the usual form of the capacitor. However, the term is meaningful when applied to any two conducting bodies such as spheres, and not necessarily ones of the same size, for example, the elevated terminals of a Tesla wireless system and the earth. These are widely spaced insulated conducting bodies positioned over a spherically conducting ground plane.

"The differential capacitance between the spheres is obtained by assuming opposite charges ±q on them ..."

Another form of differential capacitance refers to single isolated conducting bodies. It is usually discussed in books under the topic of "electrostatics". This capacitance is best defined as the rate of change of charge stored in the body divided by the rate of change of the potential of the body. The definition of the absolute potential of the body depends on what is selected as a reference. This is sometimes referred to as the "self-capacitance" of a body. If the body is a conducting sphere, the self-capacitance is proportional to its radius, and is roughly 1 pF per centimetre of radius.

== See also ==
- Capacitive coupling
- Electric displacement field
