= Streaming vibration current =

Electric signal phenomenon

The streaming vibration current (SVI) and the associated streaming vibration potential is an electric signal that arises when an acoustic wave propagates through a porous body in which the pores are filled with fluid.

Streaming vibration current was experimentally observed in 1948 by M. Williams. A theoretical model was developed some 30 years later by Dukhin and coworkers. This effect opens another possibility for characterizing the electric properties of the surfaces in porous bodies.

== See also ==
- Interface and colloid science
