= Friedrich Ernst Dorn =

German physicist and first to discover radon

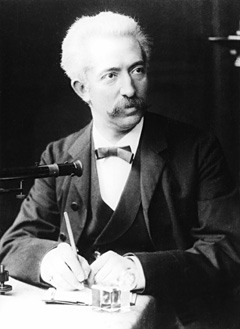
- Friedrich Ernst Dorn
- Born: 27 July 1848; Guttstadt (Dobre Miasto), Province of Prussia
- Died: 16 December 1916 (aged 68); Halle, Province of Saxony, Germany
- Education: University of Königsberg
- Known for: Dorn effect Radon
- Scientific career
- Fields: Physics
- Workplaces: Halle University

Friedrich Ernst Dorn (27 July 1848 – 16 December 1916) was a German physicist. He is best remembered for his discovery that radium emits a radioactive substance, later named radon.

== Life and work ==
Dorn was born in Guttstadt (Dobre Miasto), Province of Prussia (nowadays Warmia in Poland), and died in Halle, Province of Saxony. He was educated at Königsberg and went on to teach at the university level. In 1885, at Halle University, Dorn took over the position of personal ordinarius professor for theoretical physics from Anton Oberbeck. Since Dorn was already an ordinarius professor, he was allowed to assume the title to not appear as having been demoted. In 1895, Dorn succeeded Hermann Knoblauch at Halle as the ordinarius professor for experimental physics and director of the physics institute. Dorn's previous duties were assumed by Carl Schmidt, who had been a Privatdozent and was called as an extraordinarius professor for theoretical physics.

In 1900, Dorn published a paper in which he described experiments that repeated and extended some earlier work on thorium by Ernest Rutherford. Dorn verified Rutherford's observation that a radioactive material was emitted by thorium, and discovered that a similar emission arose from the element radium. Additional work by Rutherford and Soddy showed that the same emission came from both thorium and radium, that it was a gas, and that it was actually a new element.

Dorn called the radioactive gaseous product from radium simply "emanation", but in 1904 Rutherford introduced the name "radium emanation" for the same material. Ramsay later suggested "niton", from the Latin word "nitens" meaning "shining". In 1923 the name was again changed, this time to radon by an international body of scientists.

Marshall and Marshall have examined the original papers leading to radon's discovery and their work should be consulted for a full treatment and extensive references. They conclude that it is actually Rutherford who should be awarded credit for radon's discovery since he was the first to detect the element being emitted from any radioisotope (thorium) and the first to demonstrate radon's gaseous nature. Rutherford was also the first to integrate his own work on radon with that of others on radon's atomic mass, its spectrum, and its position on the periodic table.
