= Dukhin number =

Dimensionless number in fluid mechanics

The Dukhin number (Du) is a dimensionless quantity that characterizes the contribution of the surface conductivity to various electrokinetic and electroacoustic effects, as well as to electrical conductivity and permittivity of fluid heterogeneous systems. The number was named after Stanislav Dukhin, 1931-2025.

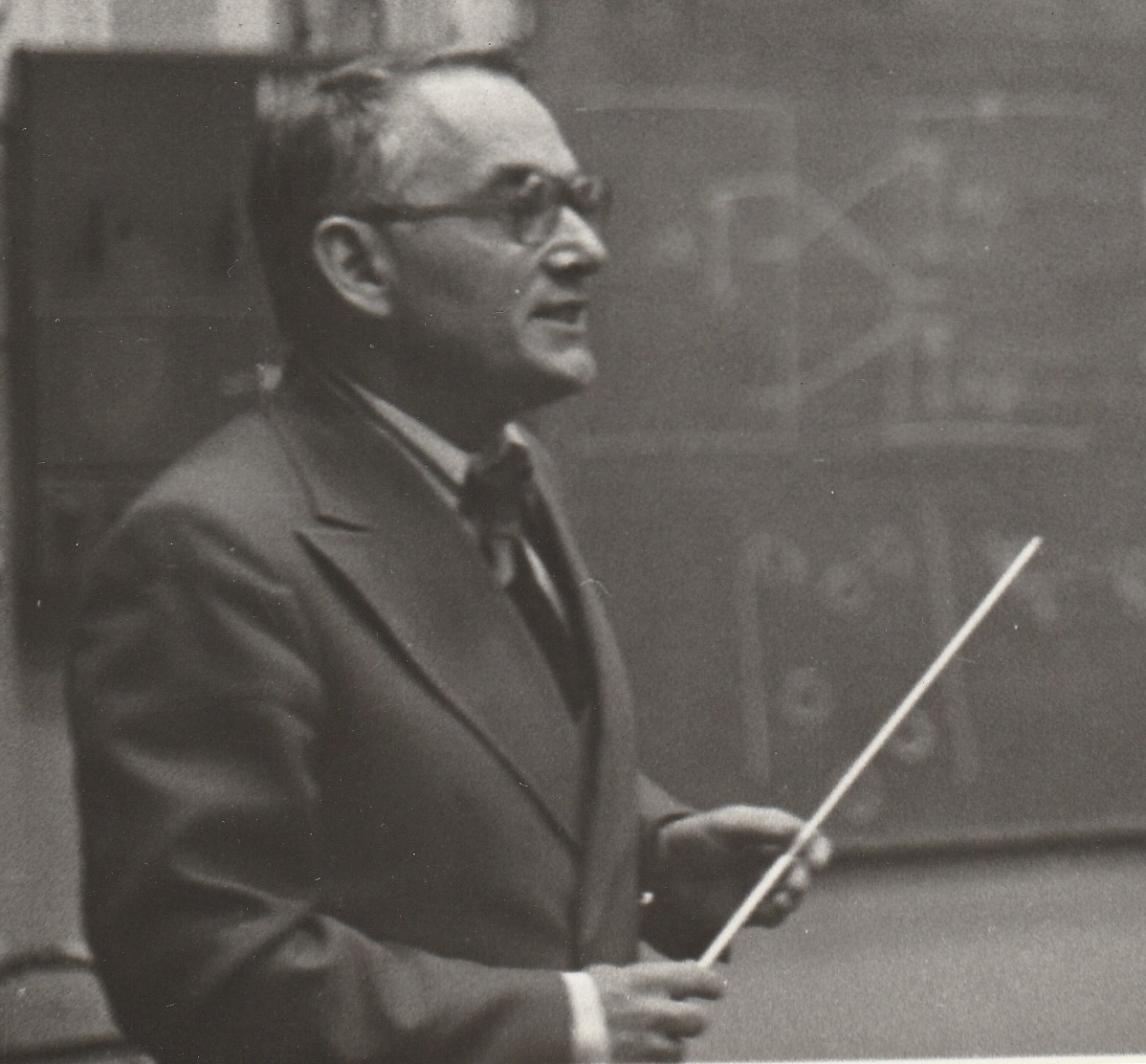
Photo of Stanislav Dukhin.

== Overview ==
It was introduced by Lyklema in “Fundamentals of Interface and Colloid Science”. A recent IUPAC Technical Report used this term explicitly and detailed several means of measurement in physical systems. International Standards on measuring zeta potential apply this notion for describing proper ways of calculating zeta potential from the experimentally measured electrophoretic mobility.

The Dukhin number is a ratio of the surface conductivity $\kappa^{\sigma}$ to the fluid bulk electrical conductivity K_{m} multiplied by particle size a:

$${\rm Du} = \frac{\kappa^{\sigma}}{{\Kappa_m}a}.$$

There is another expression of this number that is valid when the surface conductivity is associated only with ions motion above the slipping plane in the double layer. In this case, the value of the surface conductivity depends on ζ-potential, which leads to the following expression for the Dukhin number for a symmetric electrolyte of ions with the same diffusion coefficient:

$${\rm Du} = \frac{2(1+3m/z^2)}{{\kappa}a}\left(\mathrm{cosh}\frac{zF\zeta}{2RT}-1\right),$$

where the parameter m characterizes the contribution of electro-osmosis into motion of ions within the double layer

$$m = \frac{2\varepsilon_0\varepsilon_m R^2T^2}{3\eta F^2 D},$$

where

- F is the Faraday constant
- T is absolute temperature
- R is the gas constant
- C is the ion concentration in the bulk
- z is ion valency
- ζ is electrokinetic potential
- ε_{0} is vacuum permittivity
- ε_{m} is the permittivity of the fluid
- η is dynamic viscosity
- D is the diffusion coefficient
