= Ruthenium oxide =

Ruthenium oxide may refer to either of the following:

- Ruthenium(IV) oxide, RuO_{2}
- Ruthenium(VIII) oxide, RuO_{4}
