= Electric sonic amplitude =

Electric sonic amplitude or electroacoustic sonic amplitude is an electroacoustic phenomenon that is the reverse to colloid vibration current. It occurs in colloids, emulsions and other heterogeneous fluids under the influence of an oscillating electric field. This field moves particles relative to the liquid, which generates ultrasound.

Electric sonic amplitude was experimentally discovered by Oja and co-authors in the early 1980s. It is also widely used for characterizing zeta potential in dispersions and emulsions. There is review of the theory of this effect, its experimental verification, and multiple applications published by Hunter.

== See also ==
- Interface and colloid science
- Zeta potential
