= Electrokinetic phenomena =

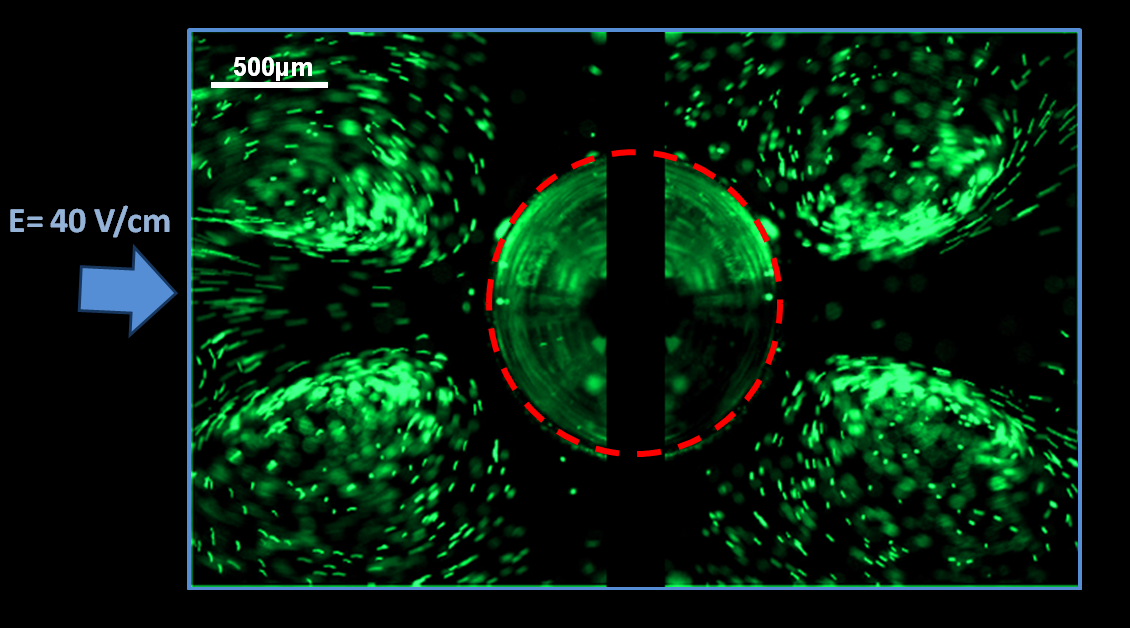
Induced vortices around conducting particle-induced-charge electrokinetics

Electrokinetic phenomena are a family of several different effects that occur in heterogeneous fluids, or in porous bodies filled with fluid, or in a fast flow over a flat surface. The term heterogeneous here means a fluid containing particles. Particles can be solid, liquid or gas bubbles with sizes on the scale of a micrometer or nanometer. There is a common source of all these effects—the so-called interfacial 'double layer' of charges. Influence of an external force on the diffuse layer generates tangential motion of a fluid with respect to an adjacent charged surface. This force might be electric, pressure gradient, concentration gradient, or gravity. In addition, the moving phase might be either continuous fluid or dispersed phase.

== List of electrokinetic phenomena ==
Various combinations of the driving force and moving phase determine various electrokinetic effects. According to J.Lyklema, the complete family of electrokinetic phenomena includes:

- electrophoresis, as motion of charged particles or molecules under influence of electric field;
- electro-osmosis, as motion of liquid in porous body under influence of electric field;
- diffusiophoresis, as motion of particles under influence of a chemical potential gradient;
- capillary osmosis, as motion of liquid in porous body under influence of the chemical potential gradient;
- sedimentation potential, as electric field generated by sedimenting colloid particles;
- streaming potential/current, as either electric potential or current generated by fluid moving through porous body, or relative to flat surface;
- colloid vibration current, as electric current generated by particles moving in fluid under influence of ultrasound;
- electric sonic amplitude, as ultrasound generated by colloidal particles in oscillating electric field.

== See also ==
- Isotachophoresis
- Onsager reciprocal relations
- Surface charge
- Cationization of cotton
