= Double layer (surface science) =

Molecular interface between a surface and a fluid

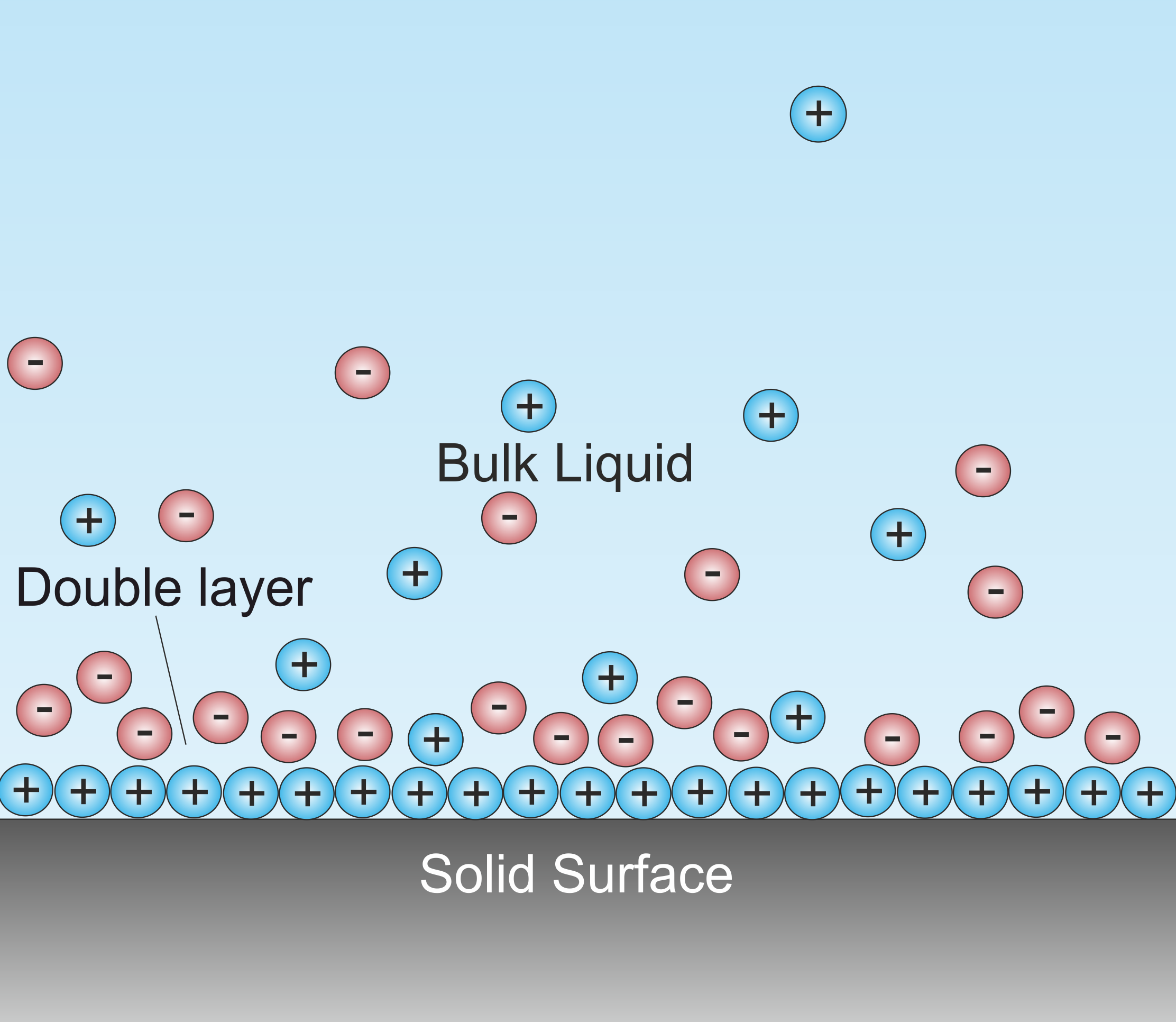
Schematic of the electrical double layer (EDL) in aqueous solution at the interface with a negatively-charged surface of a mineral solid. Blue + sphere: cations; red – spheres: anions. The number of cations is larger in the EDL close to the negatively-charged surface in order to neutralize these negative charges and to maintain electroneutrality. The drawing does not explicitly show the negative charges of the surface.

In surface science, a double layer (DL, also called an electrical double layer, EDL) is a structure that appears on the surface of an object when it is exposed to a fluid. The object might be a solid particle, a gas bubble, a liquid droplet, or a porous body. The DL refers to two parallel layers of charge surrounding the object. The first layer, the surface charge (either positive or negative), consists of ions which are adsorbed onto the object due to chemical interactions. The second layer is composed of ions attracted to the surface charge via the Coulomb force, electrically screening the first layer. This second layer is loosely associated with the object. It is made of free ions that move in the fluid under the influence of electric attraction and thermal motion rather than being firmly anchored. It is thus called the "diffuse layer".

Interfacial DLs are most apparent in systems with a large surface-area-to-volume ratio, such as a colloid or porous bodies with particles or pores (respectively) on the scale of micrometres to nanometres. However, DLs are important to other phenomena, such as the electrochemical behaviour of electrodes.

DLs play a fundamental role in many everyday substances. For instance, homogenized milk exists only because fat droplets are covered with a DL that prevents their coagulation into butter. DLs exist in practically all heterogeneous fluid-based systems, such as blood, paint, ink and ceramic and cement slurry.

The DL is closely related to electrokinetic phenomena and electroacoustic phenomena.

== Development of the (interfacial) double layer ==
=== Helmholtz ===
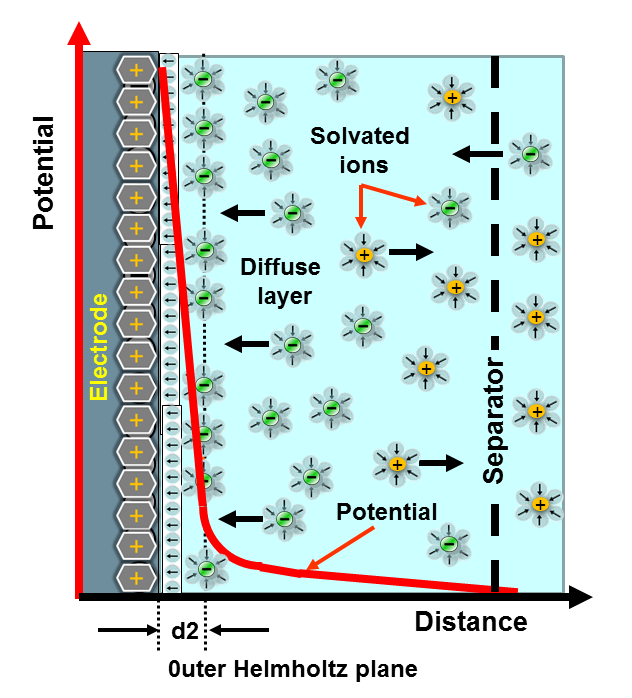
Simplified illustration of the potential development in the area and in the further course of a Helmholtz double layer.

When an electronic conductor is brought in contact with a solid or liquid ionic conductor (electrolyte), a common boundary (interface) among the two phases appears. Hermann von Helmholtz was the first to realize that charged electrodes immersed in electrolyte solutions repel the co-ions of the charge while attracting counterions to their surfaces. Two layers of opposite polarity form at the interface between electrode and electrolyte. In 1853, he showed that an electrical double layer (DL) is essentially a molecular dielectric and stores charge electrostatically. Below the electrolyte's decomposition voltage, the stored charge is linearly dependent on the voltage applied.

This early model predicted a constant differential capacitance independent from the charge density depending on the dielectric constant of the electrolyte solvent and the thickness of the double-layer.

This model, while a good foundation for the description of the interface, does not consider important factors including diffusion/mixing of ions in solution, the possibility of adsorption onto the surface, and the interaction between solvent dipole moments and the electrode.

=== Gouy–Chapman ===
Louis Georges Gouy in 1910 and David Leonard Chapman in 1913 both observed that capacitance was not a constant and that it depended on the applied potential and the ionic concentration. The "Gouy–Chapman model" made significant improvements by introducing a diffuse model of the DL. In this model, the charge distribution of ions as a function of distance from the metal surface allows Maxwell–Boltzmann statistics to be applied. Thus the electric potential decreases exponentially away from the surface of the fluid bulk.

Gouy-Chapman layers may bear special relevance in bioelectrochemistry. The observation of long-distance inter-protein electron transfer through the aqueous solution has been attributed to a diffuse region between redox partner proteins (cytochromes c and c_{1}) that is depleted of cations in comparison to the solution bulk, thereby leading to reduced screening, electric fields extending several nanometers, and currents decreasing quasi exponentially with the distance at rate ~1 nm^{−1}. This region is termed "Gouy-Chapman conduit" and is strongly regulated by phosphorylation, which adds one negative charge to the protein surface that disrupts cationic depletion and prevents long-distance charge transport. Similar effects are observed at the redox active site of photosynthetic complexes.

The Gouy-Chapman model fails for highly charged double layers as it predicts impossibly high ion densities. For large potential differences such as induced at an ideally polarizable electrode, it predicts a capacitance that unphysically rises exponentially with bias voltage up to extreme values.

=== Stern ===
In 1924, Otto Stern suggested combining the Helmholtz model with the Gouy-Chapman model: in Stern's model, some ions adhere to the electrode as suggested by Helmholtz, giving an internal Stern layer, while some form a Gouy-Chapman diffuse layer.

The Stern layer accounts for ions' finite size and consequently an ion's closest approach to the electrode is on the order of the ionic radius. The Stern model has its own limitations, namely that it effectively treats ions as point charges, assumes all significant interactions in the diffuse layer are Coulombic, assumes dielectric permittivity to be constant throughout the double layer, and that fluid viscosity is constant plane.

=== Bikerman ===
In 1942, Bikerman introduced an alternative approach which is to include a maximum density in the continuum thermodynamic assumptions, including an over-crowding (steric) entropy term instead of simply using the ideal gas entropy. In this way the density of ions as a continuum is naturally capped, and characteristically the differential capacitance does not saturate to a plateau (as with Stern–Gouy–Chapman) but instead has a 'hump' after which it falls as $1/\sqrt{V_{\mathrm{bias}}}$.

Various Bikerman-type models exist that induce a maximum density in different (but similar) ways, e.g. a lattice gas or a hard sphere model.

=== Grahame ===
Schematic representation of a double layer on an electrode (BDM) model. 1. Inner Helmholtz plane, (IHP), 2. Outer Helmholtz plane (OHP), 3. Diffuse layer, 4. Solvated ions (cations) 5. Specifically adsorbed ions (redox ion, which contributes to the pseudocapacitance), 6. Molecules of the electrolyte solvent

D. C. Grahame modified the Stern model in 1947. He proposed that some ionic or uncharged species can penetrate the Stern layer, although the closest approach to the electrode is normally occupied by solvent molecules. This could occur if ions lose their solvation shell as they approach the electrode. He called ions in direct contact with the electrode "specifically adsorbed ions". This model proposed the existence of three regions. The inner Helmholtz plane (IHP) passes through the centres of the specifically adsorbed ions. The outer Helmholtz plane (OHP) passes through the centres of solvated ions at the distance of their closest approach to the electrode. Finally the diffuse layer is the region beyond the OHP.

=== Bockris/Devanathan/Müller (BDM) ===
In 1963, J. O'M. Bockris, M. A. V. Devanathan and K.Müller proposed the BDM model of the double-layer that included the action of the solvent in the interface. They suggested that the attached molecules of the solvent, such as water, would have a fixed alignment to the electrode surface. This first layer of solvent molecules displays a strong orientation to the electric field depending on the charge. This orientation has great influence on the permittivity of the solvent that varies with field strength. The IHP passes through the centers of these molecules. Specifically adsorbed, partially solvated ions appear in this layer. The solvated ions of the electrolyte are outside the IHP. Through the centers of these ions pass the OHP. The diffuse layer is the region beyond the OHP.

=== Trasatti/Buzzanca ===
Further research with double layers on ruthenium dioxide films in 1971 by Sergio Trasatti and Giovanni Buzzanca demonstrated that the electrochemical behavior of these electrodes at low voltages with specific adsorbed ions was like that of capacitors. The specific adsorption of the ions in this region of potential could also involve a partial charge transfer between the ion and the electrode. It was the first step towards understanding pseudocapacitance.

=== Conway ===
Between 1975 and 1980, Brian Evans Conway conducted extensive fundamental and development work on ruthenium oxide electrochemical capacitors. In 1991, he described the difference between 'Supercapacitor' and 'Battery' behavior in electrochemical energy storage. In 1999, he coined the term supercapacitor to explain the increased capacitance by surface redox reactions with faradaic charge transfer between electrodes and ions.

His "supercapacitor" stored electrical charge partially in the Helmholtz double-layer and partially as the result of faradaic reactions with "pseudocapacitance" charge transfer of electrons and protons between electrode and electrolyte. The working mechanisms of pseudocapacitors are redox reactions, intercalation and electrosorption.

=== Marcus ===
The physical and mathematical basics of electron charge transfer absent chemical bonds leading to pseudocapacitance was developed by Rudolph A. Marcus. Marcus Theory explains the rates of electron transfer reactions—the rate at which an electron can move from one chemical species to another. It was originally formulated to address outer sphere electron transfer reactions, in which two chemical species change only in their charge, with an electron jumping. For redox reactions without making or breaking bonds, Marcus theory takes the place of Henry Eyring's transition state theory which was derived for reactions with structural changes. Marcus received the Nobel Prize in Chemistry in 1992 for this theory.

== Mathematical description ==
There are detailed descriptions of the interfacial DL in many books on colloid and interface science and microscale fluid transport. There is also a recent IUPAC technical report on the subject of interfacial double layer and related electrokinetic phenomena.

detailed illustration of interfacial DL

As stated by Lyklema, "...the reason for the formation of a "relaxed" ("equilibrium") double layer is the non-electric affinity of charge-determining ions for a surface..." This process leads to the buildup of an electric surface charge, expressed usually in C/m^{2}. This surface charge creates an electrostatic field that then affects the ions in the bulk of the liquid. This electrostatic field, in combination with the thermal motion of the ions, creates a counter charge, and thus screens the electric surface charge. The net electric charge in this screening diffuse layer is equal in magnitude to the net surface charge, but has the opposite polarity. As a result, the complete structure is electrically neutral.

The diffuse layer, or at least part of it, can move under the influence of tangential stress. There is a conventionally introduced slipping plane that separates mobile fluid from fluid that remains attached to the surface. Electric potential at this plane is called electrokinetic potential or zeta potential (also denoted as ζ-potential).

The electric potential on the external boundary of the Stern layer versus the bulk electrolyte is referred to as Stern potential. Electric potential difference between the fluid bulk and the surface is called the electric surface potential.

Usually zeta potential is used for estimating the degree of DL charge. A characteristic value of this electric potential in the DL is 25 mV with a maximum value around 100 mV (up to several volts on electrodes). The chemical composition of the sample at which the ζ-potential is 0 is called the point of zero charge or the iso-electric point. It is usually determined by the solution pH value, since protons and hydroxyl ions are the charge-determining ions for most surfaces.

Zeta potential can be measured using electrophoresis, electroacoustic phenomena, streaming potential, and electroosmotic flow.

The characteristic thickness of the DL is the Debye length, κ^{−1}. It is reciprocally proportional to the square root of the ion concentration C. In aqueous solutions it is typically on the scale of a few nanometers and the thickness decreases with increasing concentration of the electrolyte.

The electric field strength inside the DL can be anywhere from zero to over 10^{9} V/m. These steep electric potential gradients are the reason for the importance of the DLs.

The theory for a flat surface and a symmetrical electrolyte is usually referred to as the Gouy-Chapman theory. It yields a simple relationship between electric charge in the diffuse layer σ^{d} and the Stern potential Ψ^{d}:

$$\sigma^d = -\sqrt{{8\varepsilon_0}{\varepsilon_m}CRT}\sinh \frac{F\Psi^d}{2RT}$$

There is no general analytical solution for mixed electrolytes, curved surfaces or even spherical particles. There is an asymptotic solution for spherical particles with low charged DLs. In the case when electric potential over DL is less than 25 mV, the so-called Debye-Huckel approximation holds. It yields the following expression for electric potential Ψ in the spherical DL as a function of the distance r from the particle center:

$${\Psi}(r) = {\Psi^d}\frac{a}{r}\exp({-\kappa}(r-a))$$

There are several asymptotic models which play important roles in theoretical developments associated with the interfacial DL.

The first one is "thin DL". This model assumes that DL is much thinner than the colloidal particle or capillary radius. This restricts the value of the Debye length and particle radius as following:
$$\kappa a \gg 1$$

This model offers tremendous simplifications when applied to theories of electrophoresis and electroacoustic phenomena.

The thin DL model is valid for most aqueous systems because the Debye length is only a few nanometers in such cases. It breaks down only for nano-colloids in solution with ionic strengths close to water.

The opposing "thick DL" model assumes that the Debye length is larger than particle radius:

$$\kappa a < 1$$

This model can be useful for some nano-colloids and non-polar fluids, where the Debye length is much larger.

The last model introduces "overlapped DLs". This is important in concentrated dispersions and emulsions when distances between particles become comparable with the Debye length.

== Electrical double layers ==
The electrical double layer (EDL) is the result of the variation of electric potential near a surface, and has a significant influence on the behaviour of colloids and other surfaces in contact with solutions or solid-state fast ion conductors.

The primary difference between a double layer on an electrode and one on an interface is the mechanism of surface charge formation. With an electrode, it is possible to regulate the surface charge by applying an external electric potential. This application, however, is impossible in colloidal and porous double layers, because for colloidal particles, one does not have access to the interior of the particle to apply a potential difference.

EDLs are analogous to the double layer in plasma.

=== Differential capacitance ===
EDLs have an additional parameter defining their characterization: differential capacitance. Differential capacitance, denoted as C, is described by the equation below:

$$C = \frac{d \sigma}{ d \Psi}$$

where σ is the surface charge and ψ is the electric surface potential.

=== Electron transfer in electrical double layer ===
The formation of electrical double layer (EDL) has been traditionally assumed to be entirely dominated by ion adsorption and redistribution. With considering the fact that the contact electrification between solid-solid is dominated by electron transfer, it is suggested by Wang that the EDL is formed by a two-step process. In the first step, when the molecules in the solution first approach a virgin surface that has no pre-existing surface charges, it may be possible that the atoms/molecules in the solution directly interact with the atoms on the solid surface to form strong overlap of electron clouds. Electron transfer occurs first to make the "neutral" atoms on solid surface become charged, i.e., the formation of ions. In the second step, if there are ions existing in the liquid, such as H^{+} and OH^{–}, the loosely distributed negative ions in the solution would be attracted to migrate toward the surface bonded ions due to electrostatic interactions, forming an EDL. Both electron transfer and ion transfer co-exist at liquid-solid interface.

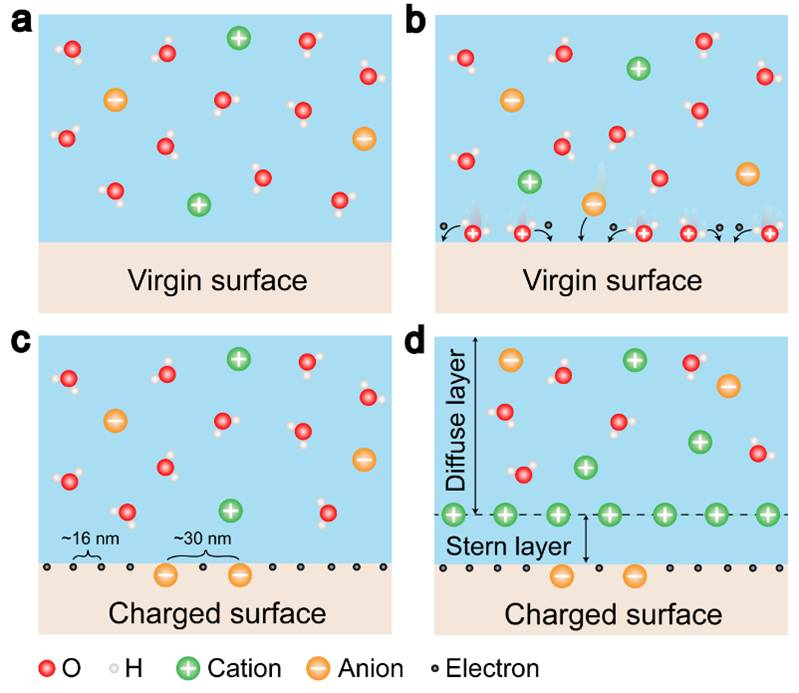
The "two-step" model (Wang model) for the formation of electric double-layer (EDL) at a liquid-solid interface, in which the electron transfer plays a dominant role in the first step.

== Dynamics of the electrical double layer ==
The dynamics of the electrical double layer (EDL) at the air–electrolyte interface have been investigated at high electrolyte concentrations using an all-optical technique. In these experiments, the surface propensity of protons (H_{3}O^{+}) at the air–aqueous interface was perturbed quasi-instantaneously, and the subsequent relaxation of the EDL was monitored using femtosecond time-resolved vibrational spectroscopy. The EDL reorganization occurred on picosecond timescales and exhibited a strong dependence on ion concentration. Non-equilibrium molecular dynamics (MD) simulations and mean-field analytical modeling, based on a modified form of the Poisson–Nernst–Planck equations combined with the Smoluchowski diffusion equation, revealed that ion conduction is the primary mechanism governing EDL dynamics. The combined experimental and theoretical results showed that the classical Debye–Falkenhagen theory can accurately describe EDL relaxation even at high ionic strengths, suggesting its applicability beyond the dilute-solution regime.

== See also ==
- Depletion region (structure of semiconductor junction)
- DLVO theory
- Electroosmotic pump
- Interface and colloid science
- Nanofluidics
- Poisson–Boltzmann equation
- Supercapacitor
