= Interface (matter) =

Boundary between volumes of matter of different types or states

In the physical sciences, an interface is the boundary between two spatial regions occupied by different matter, or by matter in different physical states. The interface between matter and air, or matter and vacuum, is called a surface, and studied in surface science. In thermal equilibrium, the regions in contact are called phases, and the interface is called a phase boundary. An example for an interface out of equilibrium is the grain boundary in polycrystalline matter.

== Significance ==
The importance of the interface depends on the type of system: the bigger the quotient area/volume, the greater the effect the interface will have. Consequently, interfaces are very important in systems with large interface area-to-volume ratios, such as colloids.

== Shape ==
Interfaces can be flat or curved. For example, oil droplets in a salad dressing are spherical but the interface between water and air in a glass of water is mostly flat.

== Surface tension ==
Surface tension is the physical property which rules interface processes involving liquids. For a liquid film on flat surfaces, the liquid-vapor interface keeps flat to minimize interfacial area and system free energy. For a liquid film on rough surfaces, the surface tension tends to keep the meniscus flat, while the disjoining pressure makes the film conformal to the substrate. The equilibrium meniscus shape is a result of the competition between the capillary pressure and disjoining pressure.

== Impacts and examples ==
Interfaces may cause various optical phenomena, such as refraction. Optical lenses serve as an example of a practical application of the interface between glass and air.

One topical interface system is the gas-liquid interface between aerosols and other atmospheric molecules.

== See also ==
- Capillary surface, a surface that represents the boundary between two fluids
- Disjoining pressure
- Free surface
- Interface and colloid science
- Membrane
- Surface phenomenon
