= Electrophoresis =

Motion of charged particles in electric field

1. Illustration of electrophoresis

2. Illustration of electrophoresis retardation

Electrophoresis is the motion of charged dispersed particles or dissolved charged molecules relative to a fluid under the influence of a spatially uniform electric field. As a rule, these zwitterionic particles and molecules have either a positive or negative net charge, which is often characterized with zeta potential.

Electrophoresis is used in laboratories to separate macromolecules based on their charges. The technique normally applies a negative charge (via the cathode) so anionic molecules move towards a positive charge (the anode). Therefore, electrophoresis of positively charged particles or molecules (cations) is sometimes called cataphoresis, while electrophoresis of negatively charged particles or molecules (anions) is sometimes called anaphoresis.

Electrophoresis is the basis for analytical techniques used in biochemistry and molecular biology to separate particles, molecules, or ions by size, charge, shape, or binding affinity, either freely or through a supportive medium using a one-directional flow of electrical charge. It is used extensively in DNA, RNA and protein analysis.

Liquid "droplet electrophoresis" is significantly different from the classic "particle electrophoresis" because of droplet characteristics such as a mobile surface charge and the nonrigidity of the interface. Also, the liquid–liquid system, where there is an interplay between the hydrodynamic and electrokinetic forces in both phases, adds to the complexity of electrophoretic motion.

== History ==
The first observation of electrophoresis occurred during first years of 19th century independently by Gautherot in 1801 and by Reuss in 1809.

The history of electrokinetics and electrophoresis for their most widely used applications, such as molecular separation and chemical analysis, began with the work of Arne Tiselius in 1931, while new separation processes and chemical speciation analysis techniques based on electrophoresis and electrokinetics continue to be developed in the 21st century. Tiselius, with support from the Rockefeller Foundation, developed the moving-boundary electrophoresis, which was described in 1937 in his well-known paper.

The method spread slowly until the advent of effective zone electrophoresis methods in the 1940s and 1950s, which used filter paper or gels as supporting media. By the 1960s, increasingly sophisticated gel electrophoresis methods made it possible to separate biological molecules based on minute physical and chemical differences, helping to drive the rise of molecular biology and biochemistry. Gel electrophoresis and related techniques became the basis for a wide range of biochemical methods, such as protein fingerprinting, Southern blot, other blotting procedures, DNA sequencing, and many more.

== Theory ==
Suspended particles have an electric surface charge, strongly affected by surface adsorbed species, on which an external electric field exerts an electrostatic Coulomb force. According to the double layer theory, all surface charges in fluids are screened by a diffuse layer of ions, which has the same absolute charge but opposite sign with respect to that of the surface charge. The electric field also exerts a force on the ions in the diffuse layer which has direction opposite to that acting on the surface charge. This latter force is not actually applied to the particle, but to the ions in the diffuse layer located at some distance from the particle surface, and part of it is transferred all the way to the particle surface through viscous stress. This part of the force is also called electrophoretic retardation force, or ERF in short. When the electric field is applied and the charged particle to be analyzed is at steady movement through the diffuse layer, the total resulting force is zero:

$$F_{\text{tot}}  =  0  =  F_{\text{el}}  +  F_{\mathrm{f}} +  F_{\text{ret}}$$

Considering the drag on the moving particles due to the viscosity of the dispersant, in the case of low Reynolds number and moderate electric field strength E, the drift velocity of a dispersed particle v is simply proportional to the applied field, which leaves the electrophoretic mobility μ_{e} defined as:

$$\mu_e = {v \over E}.$$

The most well known and widely used theory of electrophoresis was developed in 1903 by Marian Smoluchowski:

$$\mu_e = \frac{\varepsilon_r\varepsilon_0\zeta}{\eta},$$

where ε_{r} is the dielectric constant of the dispersion medium, ε_{0} is the permittivity of free space (C^{2} N^{−1} m^{−2}), η is dynamic viscosity of the dispersion medium (Pa s), and ζ is zeta potential (i.e., the electrokinetic potential of the slipping plane in the double layer, units mV or V).

The Smoluchowski theory is very powerful because it works for dispersed particles of any shape at any concentration. It has limitations on its validity. For instance, it does not include Debye length κ^{−1} (units m). However, Debye length must be important for electrophoresis, as follows immediately from Figure 2, "Illustration of electrophoresis retardation". Increasing thickness of the double layer (DL) leads to removing the point of retardation force further from the particle surface. The thicker the DL, the smaller the retardation force must be.

Detailed theoretical analysis proved that the Smoluchowski theory is valid only for sufficiently thin DL, when particle radius a is much greater than the Debye length:

$$a\kappa \gg 1.$$

This model of "thin double layer" offers tremendous simplifications not only for electrophoresis theory but for many other electrokinetic theories. This model is valid for most aqueous systems, where the Debye length is usually only a few nanometers. It only breaks for nano-colloids in solution with ionic strength close to water.

The Smoluchowski theory also neglects the contributions from surface conductivity. This is expressed in modern theory as condition of small Dukhin number:

$$Du \ll 1$$

In the effort of expanding the range of validity of electrophoretic theories, the opposite asymptotic case was considered, when Debye length is larger than particle radius:

$$a \kappa < \!\, 1.$$

Under this condition of a "thick double layer", Erich Hückel predicted the following relation for electrophoretic mobility:

$$\mu_e = \frac{2\varepsilon_r\varepsilon_0\zeta}{3\eta}.$$

This model can be useful for some nanoparticles and non-polar fluids, where Debye length is much larger than in the usual cases.

There are several analytical theories that incorporate surface conductivity and eliminate the restriction of a small Dukhin number, pioneered by Theodoor Overbeek and F. Booth. The modern, rigorous theories that are valid for any Zeta potential and often any aκ stem mostly from Dukhin–Semenikhin theory.

In the thin double layer limit, these theories confirm the numerical solution to the problem provided by Richard W. O'Brien and Lee R. White.

For modeling more complex scenarios, these simplifications become inaccurate, and the electric field must be modeled spatially, tracking its magnitude and direction. Poisson's equation can be used to model this spatially-varying electric field. Its influence on fluid flow can be modeled with the Stokes law, while transport of different ions can be modeled using the Nernst–Planck equation. This combined approach is referred to as the Poisson-Nernst-Planck-Stokes equations. It has been validated for the electrophoresis of particles.

== See also ==
- Affinity electrophoresis
- Electrophoretic deposition
- Electronic paper
- Capillary electrophoresis
- Dielectrophoresis
- Free-flow electrophoresis
- Electroblotting
- Gel electrophoresis
- Gel electrophoresis of nucleic acids
- Gel electrophoresis of proteins
- History of electrophoresis
- History of gel electrophoresis
- Immunoelectrophoresis
- Isoelectric focusing
- Isotachophoresis
- Nonlinear frictiophoresis
- Pulsed-field gel electrophoresis
- Stokes flow
