= Interface and colloid science =

Branch of chemistry and physics

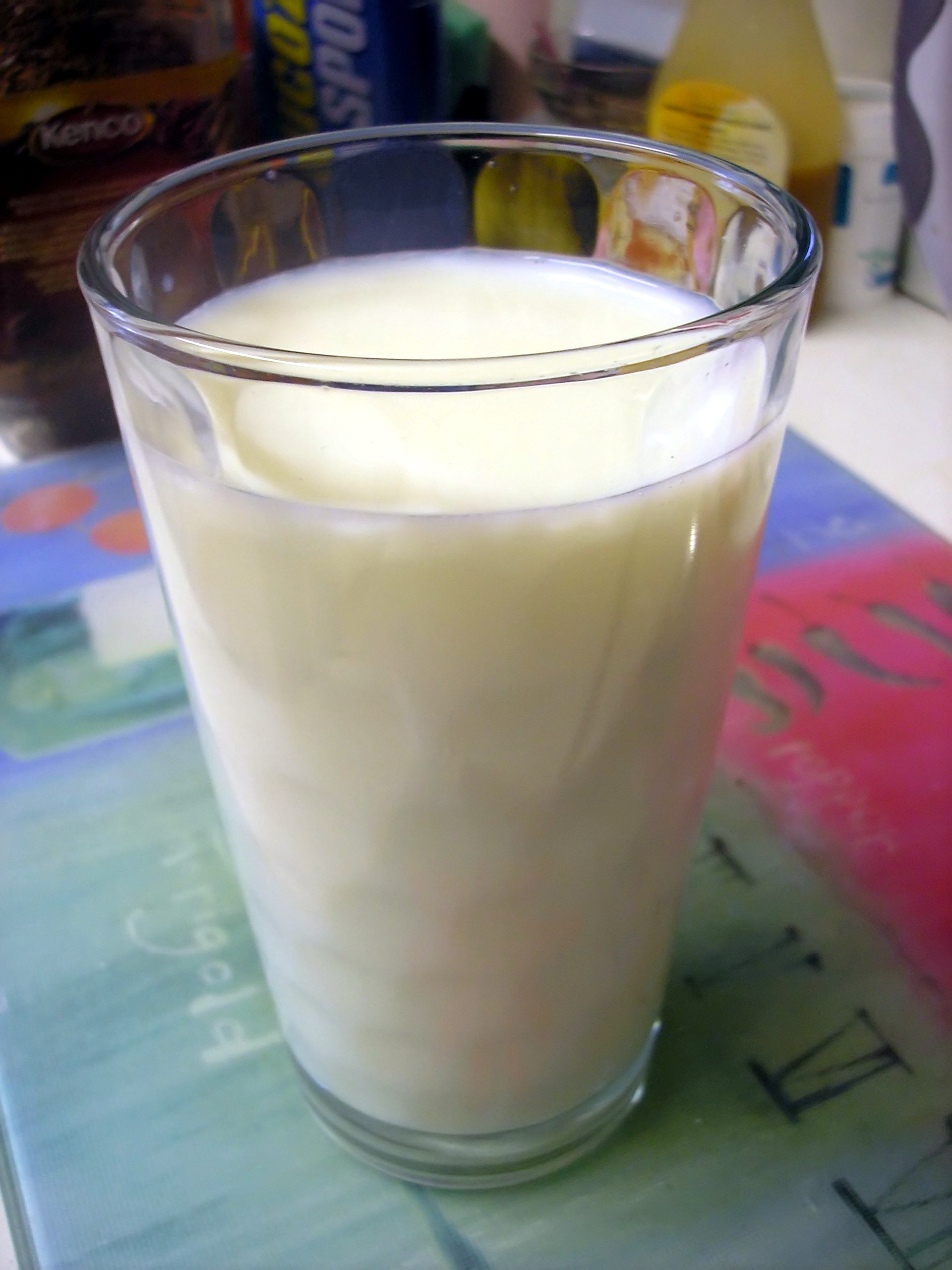
Milk is an emulsified colloid of liquid butterfat globules of 0.1 to 10 micrometer dispersed within a water-based solution.

Interface and colloid science is an interdisciplinary intersection of branches of chemistry, physics, nanoscience and other fields dealing with colloids, heterogeneous multiphase systems that contain extensive interface. One of the examples is colloid solution, which is a heterogeneous mixture in which the particle size of the substance is intermediate between a true solution and a suspension, i.e. between 1–1000 nm. Smoke from a fire is an example of a colloidal system in which tiny particles of solid float in air. Just like true solutions, colloidal particles are small and cannot be seen by the naked eye. They easily pass through filter paper. But colloidal particles are big enough to be blocked by parchment paper or animal membrane. Wetted porous materials, thin oil films on water interface are other examples of systems studied by interfaces and colloid science.

Interface and colloid science has applications and ramifications in the chemical industry, pharmaceuticals, biotechnology, ceramics, minerals, nanotechnology, and microfluidics, among others.

== History ==
Interface and colloid science remained empirical for a long time. There were some sporadic mathematical models, like electrokinetic theories in 1903 by Marian Smoluchowski,. or the theory of Brownian motion by Albert Einstein in 1905. However, these were exceptions stressing more empirical approach to the main problem of this science, including stability of colloids and thin films.

This situation has changed dramatically after invention of DLVO theory in the 1940s by the schools of Boris Derjaguin and Theodoor Overbeek. The progress of DVLO theory was described by Pierandrea Lo Nostro and Barry Ninham in 2019 as:

So in one generation colloid science had moved from a backwater of physical chemistry, puddling around in mud as it were, to center stage in theoretical physics!

Further studies by many different groups revealed cracks in the foundations of interface and colloid science. The two main problems were formulated by Ninhan with co-authors in several papers. The first one is related to cross talk between macroscopic electrostatic double layer and Van der Waals forces. The second one is associated with the role of dissolved gas, and its self organization which is ignored in modern theories.

== See also ==
- Interface (matter)
- Electrokinetic phenomena
- Surface science
