= Index of physics articles (V) =

The index of physics articles is split into multiple pages due to its size.

To navigate by individual letter use the table of contents below.

== V ==
- V. Balakrishnan (physicist)
- V838 Monocerotis
- VELO
- VEPP-2000
- VINITI Database RAS
- VIRGOHI21
- VNIR
- VORPAL
- V band
- V particle
- Vacancy defect
- Vacuum
- Vacuum Rabi oscillation
- Vacuum airship
- Vacuum arc
- Vacuum catastrophe
- Vacuum coffee maker
- Vacuum deposition
- Vacuum energy
- Vacuum expectation value
- Vacuum flask
- Vacuum genesis
- Vacuum induction melting
- Vacuum level
- Vacuum manifold
- Vacuum metallizing
- Vacuum permeability
- Vacuum permittivity
- Vacuum polarization
- Vacuum solution
- Vacuum solution (general relativity)
- Vacuum state
- Vadim Knizhnik
- Vafa–Witten theorem
- Vagn Walfrid Ekman
- Val Logsdon Fitch
- Valence band
- Valence electron
- Valentin Ceaușescu
- Valentin Danilov
- Valentin Panteleimonovich Smirnov
- Valentin Scheidel
- Valentine Bargmann
- Valentine Telegdi
- Valery Chalidze
- Valery Pokrovsky
- Van Allen radiation belt
- Van Hove singularity
- Van Stockum dust
- Van Zandt Williams
- Van de Graaff generator
- Van der Waals equation
- Van der Waerden notation
- Vandana Shiva
- Vaneless ion wind generator
- Vapor-compression refrigeration
- Vapor pressure
- Vapor quality
- Vaporization
- Vapour-pressure deficit
- Vapour density
- Variable-mass system
- Variable-sweep wing
- Variable Density Tunnel
- Variable mass hypothesis
- Variable speed of light
- Variables and some constants commonly used in physics
- Variational method
- Variational methods in general relativity
- Variational perturbation theory
- Variational principle
- Varifocal lens
- Vasco Ronchi
- Vasilii Sergeevich Vladimirov
- Vasily Vladimirovich Petrov
- Vassili Nesterenko
- Vassilis Angelopoulos
- Vassilis Papazachos
- Vector (mathematics and physics)
- Vector boson
- Vector decomposition
- Vector meson
- Vector meson dominance
- Vector potential
- Vegard's law
- Velocimetry
- Velocity
- Velocity-addition formula
- Velocity overshoot
- Velocity potential
- Velo–Zwanziger problem
- Vena contracta
- Venedikt Dzhelepov
- Veniamin Levich
- Ventilation (architecture)
- Venturi effect
- Venturi flume
- Vera Yurasova
- Verdet constant
- Vergence (optics)
- Vern Oliver Knudsen
- Vernon Ellis Cosslett
- Versatile Toroidal Facility
- Vertex distance
- Vertex function
- Vertex model
- Vertex operator algebra
- Vertical-cavity surface-emitting laser
- Vertical-external-cavity surface-emitting-laser
- Vertical deflection
- Vertical wind tunnel
- Vertico SMI
- Very-long-baseline interferometry
- Very Large Array
- Very Large Hadron Collider
- Very Small Array
- Very high frequency
- Very large floating structure
- Very low frequency
- Very special relativity
- Via Panisperna boys
- Vibrating sample magnetometer
- Vibrating string
- Vibrating structure gyroscope
- Vibration
- Vibration galvanometer
- Vibration isolation
- Vibrational analysis with scanning probe microscopy
- Vibrational energy relaxation
- Vibrational partition function
- Vibrational transition
- Vibronic coupling
- Vickers hardness test
- Victor Albert Bailey
- Victor Balykin
- Victor Emery
- Victor Francis Hess
- Victor Frederick Weisskopf
- Victor Ninov
- Victor Pavlovich Maslov
- Victor Popov
- Victor Schumann
- Victor Vacquier
- Victor Veselago
- Vienna Ab initio Simulation Package
- Vienna Standard Mean Ocean Water
- Vienna rectifier
- View factor
- Vijay Raghunath Pandharipande
- Viking Olver Eriksen
- Vikram Sarabhai
- Viktor Dilman
- Viktor Hambardzumyan
- Viktor Safronov
- Viktor Trkal
- Vilhelm Bjerknes
- Vilho Väisälä
- Villari effect
- Vincenc Strouhal
- Vincent Courtillot
- Vincent Kavečanský
- Vincenzo Viviani
- Vinko Dvořák
- Vinča Nuclear Institute
- Virasoro algebra
- Virgin neutron
- Virgo interferometer
- Virial coefficient
- Virial expansion
- Virial stress
- Virial theorem
- Virtual black hole
- Virtual image
- Virtual particle
- Virtual state
- Virtual work
- Vis-viva equation
- Vis viva
- Viscimetry
- Viscoelasticity
- Viscometer
- Viscosity
- Viscosity of amorphous materials
- Viscous fingering
- Viscous remanent magnetization
- Viscous stress tensor
- Visible-light photon counter
- Visible spectrum
- Visible-spectrum telescope
- Vitaly Efimov
- Vitaly Ginzburg
- Vito Volterra
- Vitrification
- Vittorio Prodi
- Vladimir A. Babeshko
- Vladimir Alexandrov
- Vladimir Belousov
- Vladimir Damgov
- Vladimir E. Zakharov
- Vladimir Fock
- Vladimir Gribov
- Vladimir Hütt
- Vladimir Ignatowski
- Vladimir Jurko Glaser
- Vladimir Keilis-Borok
- Vladimir Korepin
- Vladimir Krivchenkov
- Vladimir M. Shalaev
- Vladimir Paar
- Vladimir Rojansky
- Vladimir Shalaev
- Vladimir Steklov
- Vladimir Teplyakov
- Vladimir Varićak
- Vladimir Veksler
- Vlasov equation
- Vlatko Vedral
- Voigt effect
- Volatility (chemistry)
- Volker Heine
- Volodymyr Semynozhenko
- Volt
- Volta Prize
- Volta potential
- Voltage
- Volume (thermodynamics)
- Volume fraction
- Volume of fluid method
- Volume viscosity
- Volumetric flow rate
- Volumetric flux
- Volumetric heat capacity
- Volute (pump)
- von Karman Institute for Fluid Dynamics
- Von Kármán constant
- Von Neumann entropy
- Vortex
- Vortex-induced vibration
- Vortex (software)
- Vortex core line
- Vortex dynamics
- Vortex generator
- Vortex lattice method
- Vortex lift
- Vortex ring
- Vortex ring state
- Vortex ring toy
- Vortex shedding
- Vortex sheet
- Vortex state
- Vortex stretching
- Vortical
- Vorticity
- Vorticity confinement
- Vorticity equation
- Vorton
- Vsevolod Frederiks
- Vulcan laser
