= Vladimir Schneider =

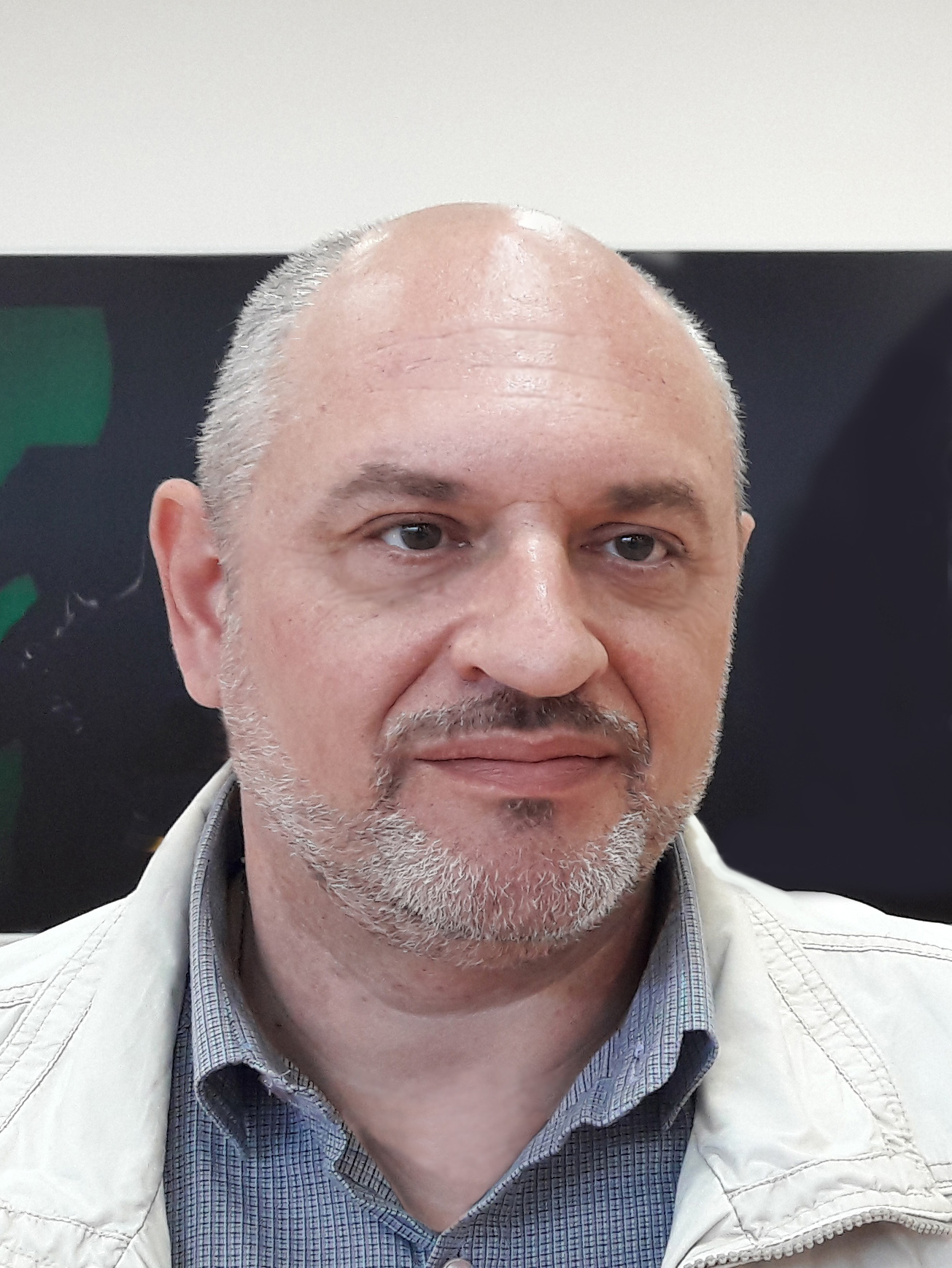
- Born: April 16, 1966 (age 60); Armavir, Krasnodar Territory
- Occupations: Doctor of historical sciences, associate professor
- Known for: historian, specialist in the history of the North Caucasus in the 20th century
- Notable work: Советское нациестроительство на Северном Кавказе (1917 – конец 1950–х гг.) : закономерности и противоречия: монография; Немцы Армавира. – Армавир : «Полиграфическое предприятие им. Г.Скорины».

Vladimir Schneider (Russian: Шнайдер, Владимир Геннадьевич; born April 16, 1966, Armavir, Krasnodar Territory) is a Russian historian, Doctor of Historical Sciences. He is the author of more than 150 scientific works, among which 7 monographs. He is a professor in the department of universal and national history of Armavir State Pedagogical University. Worked as dean of the history department of ASPU from 1999 to 2011. The main directions of scientific work: the socio-cultural aspect of the history of the peoples of the North Caucasus; Soviet national policy in the North Caucasus of 1917 – the end of the 1950s; the history of the deportations, the stay at the special settlement and the rehabilitation of the North Caucasian peoples; historical and cultural integration processes in the North Caucasus; the history of the German diaspora in the Kuban; historical research methodology issues.

== Biography ==
V.G. Schneider was born in 1966, his childhood and youth were spent in Armavir, graduated from Kuban State University. Specializes in the field of social history of peoples North Caucasus / North Caucasus, also studies the history of ethno-cultural associations that have arisen and exist in the conditions of the city. He wrote the history of the German community of Armavir from the last third of the XIX and until the beginning of the XXI centuries, and also worked in the field of research methodology of the history of the origin and development of communities in the numerically dominant foreign ethnic and foreign cultural environment.

After serving in the army in 1987, Vladimir G. entered the history department of the Kuban State University. At that time, perestroika was taking place in the country and in Soviet social science, at the faculty the teachers discovered new research methodologies for themselves and shared them with students. Students created various interest clubs, participated in political discussions, of which Vladimir was an active participant.

V.G. Schneider graduated from university in 1992. Vladimir G. returns to Armavir and begins his scientific and professional activities as a teacher in the department of cultural studies Armavir State Pedagogical Institute (AGPI).

From 1994 to 1996, Schneider VG He studied at the graduate school of the AGPI, which he successfully completed by defending his thesis for the degree of candidate of historical sciences on the topic: “Workers of the North Caucasus (end of the XIX century – February 1917): history of social formation)”.

V.G. Schneider has a wide range of scientific interests: Russian and world culture, the deportation of North Caucasian peoples and their rehabilitation, the national policy of the Soviet state in the North Caucasus, and much more.

V.G. Schneider deals with questions of the methodology of history. In particular, he developed and presented in a number of publications, including one monograph, an original concept of socio-political cycles in the history of Russia.

Vladimir Schneider has been a member of national-cultural associations of Russian Germans in Armavir since the early 1990s. and until today. An active participant in the activities of the Armavir city German national-cultural autonomy, the author of many scientific publications on the history of the Germans of Armavir and the Middle Kuban (more than 20), including three monographs.

In 2008, Vladimir defended his doctoral thesis on the topic "National construction as a factor in the sociocultural integration of the peoples of the North Caucasus into Soviet society (1917 – the end of the 1950s)" at Stavropol State University and the following year occupied the position of professor of the Russian history department in the 20th century . in ASPU. He still leads the main courses, deals with the history of Russia from the point of view of macro-history, traces the long-term social and historical dynamics of the processes of state expansion and decline, bureaucratization and secularization, revolutions and wars.

In 2011–2012 V.G. Schneider worked in an administrative position, as a vice-rector for research and innovation activities at ASPU. Elected member of the Dissertation Council on Historical Sciences in Adygei State University.

In September 2012, he moved to the Armavir branch of the Kuban State University, where he worked until 2017.

Since September 2017, Vladimir Gennadyevich has been working as a professor in the department of general and national history of Armavir State Pedagogical University. V. Schneider provides scientific guidance on the activities of several undergraduates and postgraduates of the ASPU; is a member of the editorial board of the journal "Bulletin of the Armavir State Pedagogical University" and the scientific and methodological yearbook "History and Social Science".

V. Schneider is active in educational activities, popularizing the history of his native city and creating a positive image of Armavir in the media space. He is the creator and author of the materials of the YouTube channel "Armavirgorod", dedicated to the history and modernity of the city of Armavir.

== Awards ==
- Diploma of the Ministry of Education and Science of the Russian Federation for significant contribution to the training of highly qualified specialists, significant successes in scientific and pedagogical and research work and many years of fruitful work. Order dated April 21, 2008, No. 679 / к-н
- Honorary Diploma of the Department of Education and Science of the Krasnodar Territory for high results in research work, training of teaching staff / 2010
- Certificate of honor from the administration of the municipality of the city of Armavir for personal contribution to the implementation of the event of the regional target program "Support for the Municipal Archives of the Krasnodar Territory". 2011

== Books and articles ==
- Шнайдер В. Г. «Немецкие книги» АОАА как исторический источник – Москва|Берлин: Директ-Медиа, 2015. 88 p.
- Шнайдер В. Г. Социально-политические циклы в истории России : природа и механика – Москва|Берлин: Директ-Медиа, 2015/ 50 p.
- Шнайдер В. Г. Советское нациестроительство на Северном Кавказе (1917 – конец 1950–х гг.) : закономерности и противоречия: монография – Москва|Берлин: Директ-Медиа, 2015. 414 p.
- Шнайдер В. Г. Советская национальная политика и народы Северного Кавказа в 1940–1950–е гг.: монография – Москва|Берлин: Директ-Медиа, 2015. 236 p.
- Шнайдер В. Г. (2006). Гуманитарные и социально-экономические науки: Проблемы освоения территории бывшей Чечено – Ингушской АССР после депортации местного населения : (Середина 40 – х годов).N. 4 (23). Ростов-на-Дону.
- Шнайдер В.Г., Шхачемуков Р.М., Койчуев А.Д. Становление и развитие рабочего класса на Северном Кавказе в конце XIX – начале ХХ вв.: историография проблемы // Вестник Адыгейского государственного университета. Вып. 3(224). 2018. С. 68–76
- Шнайдер В.Г. Октябрьская революция в контексте социально-политических циклов в истории России// Материалы Всероссийской научной конференции «Великая российская революция: формирование исторического сознания»/ Вестник Адыгейского государственного университета, 2017, Вып.4. – С. 276–277.
- Шнайдер В.Г. Методы и приемы исследования этнокультурной общины в городских условиях// Исторические, философские, политические и юридические науки, культурология и искусствоведение. Вопросы теории и практики. Часть 3. 2014. No.5 (43). – С. 211–215.
- Шнайдер В.Г. Этнокультурная община в городских условиях: опыт локально-исторического исследования// Исторические, философские, политические и юридические науки, культурология и искусствоведение. Вопросы теории и практики. – Тамбов: Грамота, 2013. No.5(31): в 2-х ч. Ч. II. – С. 215–220
- Голованова С.А., Шнайдер В.Г. Понятие "frontier" в современной кавказоведческой литературе// Вестник Адыгейского государственного университета. 2012, No.3 (102). – С. 59–67.
- Голованова С.А., Шнайдер В.Г. (2012). "Миграционные процессы и проблема устойчивости состава немецкой части населения г. Армавира с конца XIX в. до 1941 г." (4). Майкоп: Вестник Адыгейского государственного университета: 84–91.
- Шнайдер, В.Г. (2008). "Развитие промышленности как фактор социокультурной интеграции на Северном Кавказе в 1920-1930-е гг" (6). Армавир: Научные проблемы гуманитарных исследований: 99–106.
- Шнайдер, В.Г. Проблемы социальной адаптации депортированных народов Северного Кавказа в местах спецпоселения (середина 1940–х – середина 1950–х гг.)// Известия РГПУ им. А.И. Герцена. – СПб., 2008. – № 11(66). – С. 261–269. (2008). "Проблемы социальной адаптации депортированных народов Северного Кавказа в местах спецпоселения (середина 1940–х – середина 1950–х гг.)" (PDF). 11 (66). Известия РГПУ им. А.И. Герцена. – СПб.: 261–269.
- Шнайдер В.Г. (2007). "Особенности социокультурной ситуации на Северном Кавказе в сер. 1940 – кон. 1950–х гг" (2). Вестник Российского государственного университета дружбы народов, Серия «История России»: 111–118.
- Шнайдер В.Г., Ктиторов С.Н. Немцы Армавира (2012). Ктиторов С.Н. Немцы Армавира. Армавир: ООО «Полиграфическое предприятие им. Г.Скорины»./ 680 p.
- Шнайдер В.Г., Шхачемуков Р.М., Койчуев А.Д. (2018). "Становление и развитие рабочего класса на Северном Кавказе в конце XIX – начале ХХ вв". историография проблемы // Вестник Адыгейского государственного университета. Вып. 3(224): 68–76.
- Шнайдер В.Г. Рабочие Северного Кавказа (последняя треть XIX в. – февраль 1917 г.): становление социального слоя. Армавир: Полипринт, 2016. – 176 с.
- Шнайдер В.Г., Кун В.В. Армавирская городская немецкая национально-культурная автономия: история и современность. Армавир: Типография им. Г. Скорины, 2020. 102 с.
- Шнайдер В.Г. Ктиторов С.Н. (Численность и миграционная активность немецкого населения Армавира (конец 1880–х – 1941 гг.)) Features and Results of Demographic Processes Among the German Population of Armavir (late 1880s – 1941) // Population Processes, 2022. 7(1): PP. 8–18. USA
