= Tears of wine =

Ring of liquid and droplets in a wineglass

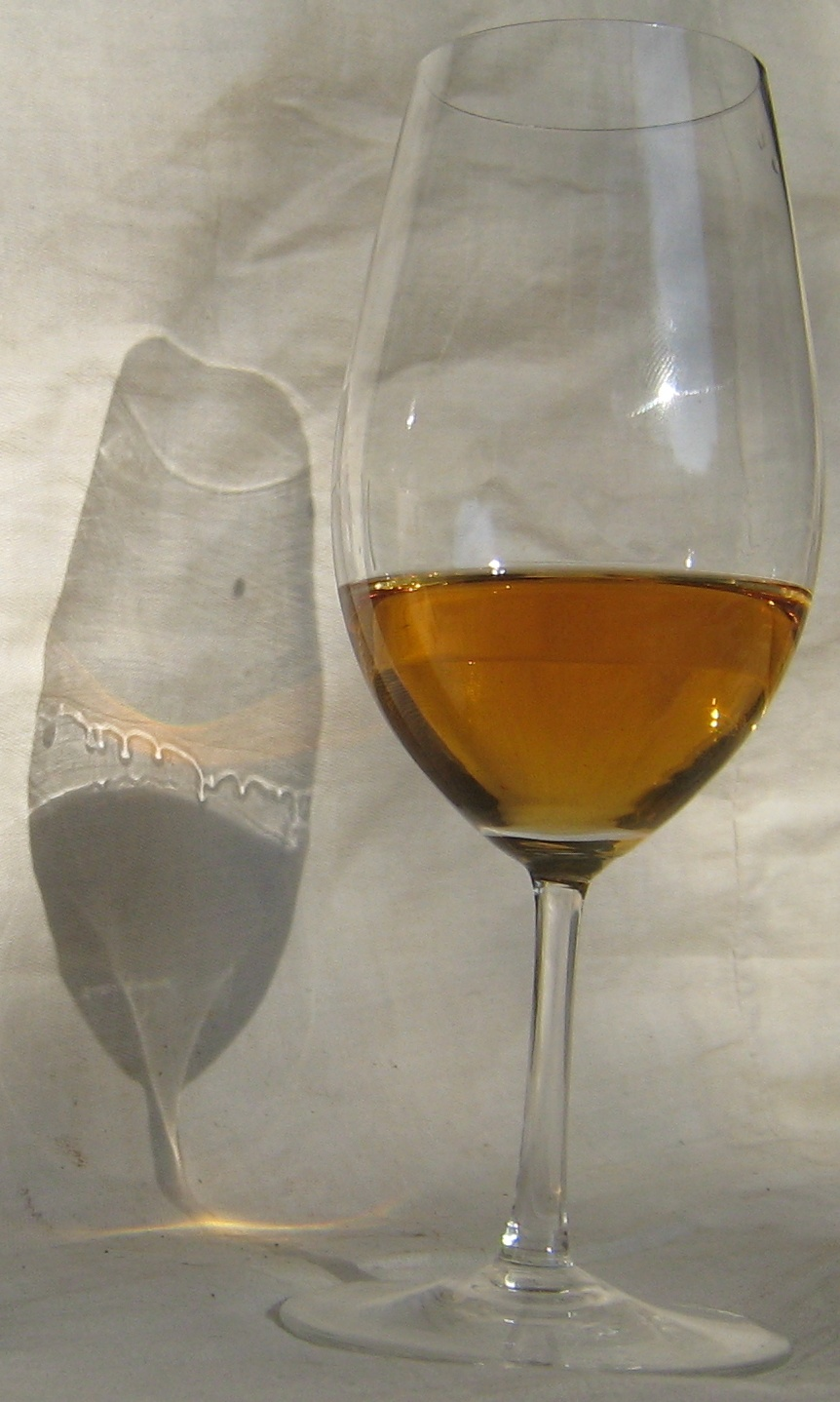
Tears of wine show clearly in the shadow of this glass of 13.5% Caluso Passito dessert wine

The phenomenon called tears of wine (French: Larmes de vin; German: Kirchenfenster, lit. "church windows") is manifested as a ring of clear liquid, near the top of a glass of wine, from which droplets continuously form and drop back into the wine. It is most readily observed in a wine which has a high alcohol content. It is also referred to as wine legs, fingers, curtains, church windows, or feet.

== Cause ==
The effect is a consequence of the fact that alcohol has a lower surface tension than water. If alcohol is mixed with water inhomogeneously, a region with a lower concentration of alcohol will pull on the surrounding fluid more strongly than a region with a higher alcohol concentration. The result is that the liquid tends to flow away from regions with higher alcohol concentration. This can be easily and strikingly demonstrated by spreading a thin film of water on a smooth surface and then allowing a drop of alcohol to fall on the center of the film. The water will rush out of the region where the drop of alcohol fell.

Wine is mostly a mixture of alcohol and water, with dissolved sugars, acids, colourants and flavourants. Where the surface of the wine meets the side of the glass, capillary action makes the liquid climb the side of the glass. As it does so, both alcohol and water evaporate from the rising film, but the alcohol evaporates faster, due to its higher vapor pressure. The resulting decrease in the concentration of alcohol causes the surface tension of the liquid to increase, and this causes more liquid to be drawn up from the bulk of the wine, which has a lower surface tension because of its higher alcohol content. The wine moves up the side of the glass and forms droplets that fall back under their own weight.

The phenomenon was first correctly explained by physicist James Thomson, the elder brother of Lord Kelvin, in 1855. It is an instance of what is today called the Marangoni effect (or the Gibbs-Marangoni effect): the flow of liquid caused by surface tension gradients.

The evaporation of alcohol also creates a temperature variation along the film of wine due to evaporative cooling. Since surface tension increases with decreasing temperature, this leads to an enhancement of the Marangoni effect that, until recently, had been overlooked.

The effect can be used to move water droplets around in technical applications.

It is sometimes claimed incorrectly that wine with "lots of legs" is sweeter or of a better quality. In fact the intensity of this phenomenon depends only on alcohol content, and it can be eliminated completely by covering the wine glass (which stops the evaporation of the alcohol). British physicist C. V. Boys argues that the biblical injunction, "Look not thou upon the wine when it is red, when it giveth his colour in the cup, when it moveth itself aright", (Proverbs 23:31) refers to this effect. Since the "tears of wine" are most noticeable in wine which has a high alcohol content, the author may be suggesting this as a way to identify wines that should be avoided in the interest of sobriety.

In 2019 a paper indicated that shock-wave dynamics may play a part in the phenomenon.

== Related phenomena ==
Other fluid phenomena that arise in alcohol-water mixtures are beading, viscimation and louching.

Beading refers to the formation of stable bubbles when liquor is shaken. This occurs only in liquor that contains more than 46% alcohol. It is an example of the Marangoni effect. Shaking a whisky bottle to form bubbles is referred to as "beating [beading] the whisky".

Viscimation is the formation of whorls when water is added to a high-alcohol mixture. The phenomenon is more pronounced in stronger liquor.

Louching is the spontaneous formation of a stable milky oil-in-water emulsion when water is added to ouzo and other anise-flavored liqueurs and spirits.

== See also ==
- Surface tension
- Marangoni effect
