= Krivchenkov =

Krivchenkov (Russian: Кривченков) is a Russian masculine surname, its feminine counterpart is Krivchenkova. It may refer to

- Alexei Krivchenkov (born 1974), Russian ice hockey defenceman
- Vladimir Krivchenkov (1917–1997), Russian physicist
