= Marangoni effect =

Physical phenomenon between two fluids

Experimental demonstration of the Marangoni effect. Pepper is sprinkled onto the surface of the water in the left dish; when a droplet of soap is added to that water, the specks of pepper move rapidly outwards.

The Marangoni effect (also called the Gibbs–Marangoni effect) is the mass transfer along an interface between two phases due to a gradient of the surface tension. In the case of temperature dependence, this phenomenon may be called thermo-capillary convection or Bénard–Marangoni convection.

== History ==
This phenomenon was first identified in the so-called "tears of wine" by physicist James Thomson (Lord Kelvin's brother) in 1855. The general effect is named after Italian physicist Carlo Marangoni, who studied it for his doctoral dissertation at the University of Pavia and published his results in 1865. A complete theoretical treatment of the subject was given by J. Willard Gibbs in his work On the Equilibrium of Heterogeneous Substances (1875–1878).

== Mechanism ==
Since a liquid with a high surface tension pulls more strongly on the surrounding liquid than one with a low surface tension, the presence of a gradient in surface tension will naturally cause the liquid to flow away from regions of low surface tension. The surface tension gradient can be caused by concentration gradient or by a temperature gradient (surface tension is an inversely proportional function of temperature).

In simple cases, the speed of the flow $u \approx \Delta\gamma/\mu$, where $\Delta\gamma$ is the difference in surface tension and $\mu$ is the viscosity of the liquid. Water at room temperature has a surface tension of around 0.07 N/m and a viscosity of approximately 10^{−3} Pa⋅s. So even variations of a few percent in the surface tension of water can generate Marangoni flows of almost 1 m/s. Thus Marangoni flows are common and easily observed.

For the case of a small drop of surfactant dropped onto the surface of water, Roché and coworkers performed quantitative experiments and developed a simple model that was in approximate agreement with the experiments. This described the expansion in the radius $r$ of a patch of the surface covered in surfactant, due to an outward Marangoni flow at a speed $u$. They found that speed of expansion of the surfactant-covered patch of the water surface occurred at speed of approximately

$$u \approx \frac{(\gamma_\text{w} - \gamma_\text{s})^{2/3}}{(\mu\rho r)^{1/3}}$$

for $\gamma_\text{w}$ the surface tension of water, $\gamma_\text{s}$ the (lower) surface tension of the surfactant-covered water surface, $\mu$ the viscosity of water, and $\rho$ the mass density of water. For $(\gamma_\text{w} - \gamma_\text{s}) \approx 10^{-2}$ N/m, i.e., of order of tens of percent reduction in surface tension of water, and as for water $\mu\rho \sim 1$ N⋅m^{−6}⋅s^{3}, we obtain $u \approx 10^{-2}\,r^3$ with u in m/s and r in m. This gives speeds that decrease as surfactant-covered region grows, but are of order of cm/s to mm/s.

The equation is obtained by making a couple of simple approximations, the first is by equating the stress at the surface due to the concentration gradient of surfactant (which drives the Marangoni flow) with the viscous stresses (that oppose flow). The Marangoni stress $\sim (\partial\gamma/\partial r)$, i.e., gradient in the surface tension due gradient in the surfactant concentration (from high in the centre of the expanding patch, to zero far from the patch). The viscous shear stress is simply the viscosity times the gradient in shear velocity $\sim \mu (u/l)$, for $l$ the depth into the water of the flow due to the spreading patch. Roché and coworkers assume that the momentum (which is directed radially) diffuses down into the liquid, during spreading, and so when the patch has reached a radius $r$, $l \sim (\nu r/u)^{1/2}$, for $\nu = \mu/\rho$ the kinematic viscosity, which is the diffusion constant for momentum in a fluid. Equating the two stresses,

$$u^{3/2} \approx \frac{(\nu r)^{1/2}}{\mu}\left(\frac{\partial\gamma}{\partial r}\right)
\approx \frac{r^{1/2}}{(\mu\rho)^{1/2}}\frac{\gamma_\text{w} - \gamma_\text{s}}{r},$$

where we approximated the gradient $(\partial\gamma/\partial r) \approx (\gamma_\text{w} - \gamma_\text{s})/r$. Taking the 2/3 power of both sides gives the expression above.

The Marangoni number, a dimensionless value, can be used to characterize the relative effects of surface tension and viscous forces.

== Tears of wine ==
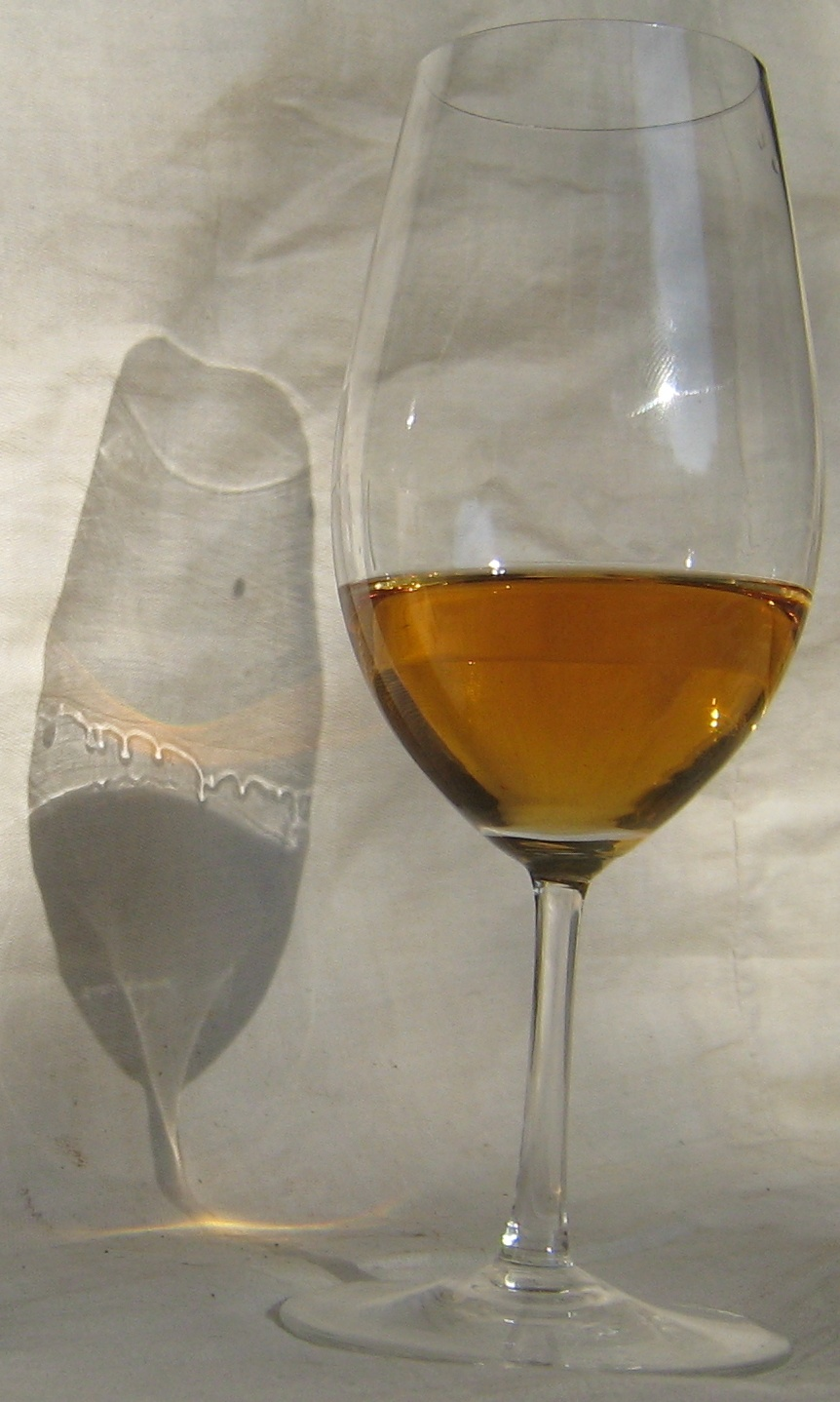
Tears of wine show clearly in the shadow of this glass of wine with a 13.5% alcohol content

As an example, wine may exhibit a visible effect called "tears of wine". The effect is a consequence of the fact that alcohol has a lower surface tension and higher volatility than water. The water/alcohol solution rises up the surface of the glass lowering the surface energy of the glass. Alcohol evaporates from the film leaving behind liquid with a higher surface tension (more water, less alcohol). This region with a lower concentration of alcohol (greater surface tension) pulls on the surrounding fluid more strongly than the regions with a higher alcohol concentration (lower in the glass). The result is the liquid is pulled up until its own weight exceeds the force of the effect, and the liquid drips back down the vessel's walls. This can also be easily demonstrated by spreading a thin film of water on a smooth surface and then allowing a drop of alcohol to fall on the center of the film. The liquid will rush out of the region where the drop of alcohol fell.

== Significance to transport phenomena ==
Under earth conditions, the effect of gravity causing natural convection in a system with a temperature gradient along a fluid/fluid interface is usually much stronger than the Marangoni effect. Many experiments (ESA MASER 1-3) have been conducted under microgravity conditions aboard sounding rockets to observe the Marangoni effect without the influence of gravity. Research on heat pipes performed on the International Space Station revealed that whilst heat pipes exposed to a temperature gradient on Earth cause the inner fluid to evaporate at one end and migrate along the pipe, thus drying the hot end, in space (where the effects of gravity can be ignored) the opposite happens and the hot end of the pipe is flooded with liquid. This is due to the Marangoni effect, together with capillary action. The fluid is drawn to the hot end of the tube by capillary action. But the bulk of the liquid still ends up as a droplet a short distance away from the hottest part of the tube, explained by Marangoni flow. The temperature gradients in axial and radial directions makes the fluid flow away from the hot end and the walls of the tube, towards the center axis. The liquid forms a droplet with a small contact area with the tube walls, a thin film circulating liquid between the cooler droplet and the liquid at the hot end.

The effect of the Marangoni effect on heat transfer in the presence of gas bubbles on the heating surface (e.g., in subcooled nucleate boiling) has long been ignored, but it is currently a topic of ongoing research interest because of its potential fundamental importance to the understanding of heat transfer in boiling.

== Examples and application ==
A freezing soap bubble with the Marangoni effect stabilizing the soap film.

A familiar example is in soap films: the Marangoni effect stabilizes soap films. Another instance of the Marangoni effect appears in the behavior of convection cells, the so-called Bénard cells.

One important application of the Marangoni effect is the use for drying silicon wafers after a wet processing step during the manufacture of integrated circuits. Liquid spots left on the wafer surface can cause oxidation that damages components on the wafer. To avoid spotting, an alcohol vapor (IPA) or other organic compound in gas, vapor, or aerosol form is blown through a nozzle over the wet wafer surface (or at the meniscus formed between the cleaning liquid and wafer as the wafer is lifted from an immersion bath), and the subsequent Marangoni effect causes a surface-tension gradient in the liquid allowing gravity to more easily pull the liquid completely off the wafer surface, effectively leaving a dry wafer surface.

A similar phenomenon has been creatively utilized to self-assemble nanoparticles into ordered arrays and other patterns, and to grow ordered nanotubes. An alcohol containing nanoparticles is spread on the substrate, followed by blowing humid air over the substrate. The alcohol is evaporated under the flow. Simultaneously, water condenses and forms microdroplets on the substrate. Meanwhile, the nanoparticles in alcohol are transferred into the microdroplets and finally form numerous coffee rings on the substrate after drying.

Another application is the manipulation of particles taking advantage of the relevance of the surface tension effects at small scales. A controlled thermo-capillary convection is created by locally heating the air–water interface using an infrared laser. Then, this flow is used to control floating objects in both position and orientation and can prompt the self-assembly of floating objects, profiting from the Cheerios effect.

The Marangoni effect is also important to the fields of welding, crystal growth and electron beam melting of metals.

== See also ==
- Plateau–Rayleigh instability — an instability in a stream of liquid
- Diffusioosmosis - the Marangoni effect is flow at a fluid/fluid interface due to a gradient in the interfacial free energy, the analog at a fluid/solid interface is diffusioosmosis
