= Giovanni Cantoni =

Italian physicist

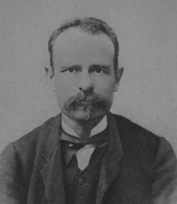
Giovanni Cantoni

Giovanni Cantoni (31 December 1818 – 15 July 1897) was an Italian physicist and political figure.

== Life ==
He taught at the University of Pavia, where Carlo Marangoni was among his students, and headed the Italian metrological service from 1865–1878.

In 1848, he participated in the Five Days of Milan and directed the secretary of defense committee for the provisional government of Lombardy. In 1872, he became a member of the Accademia dei Lincei.

== Works in physics ==
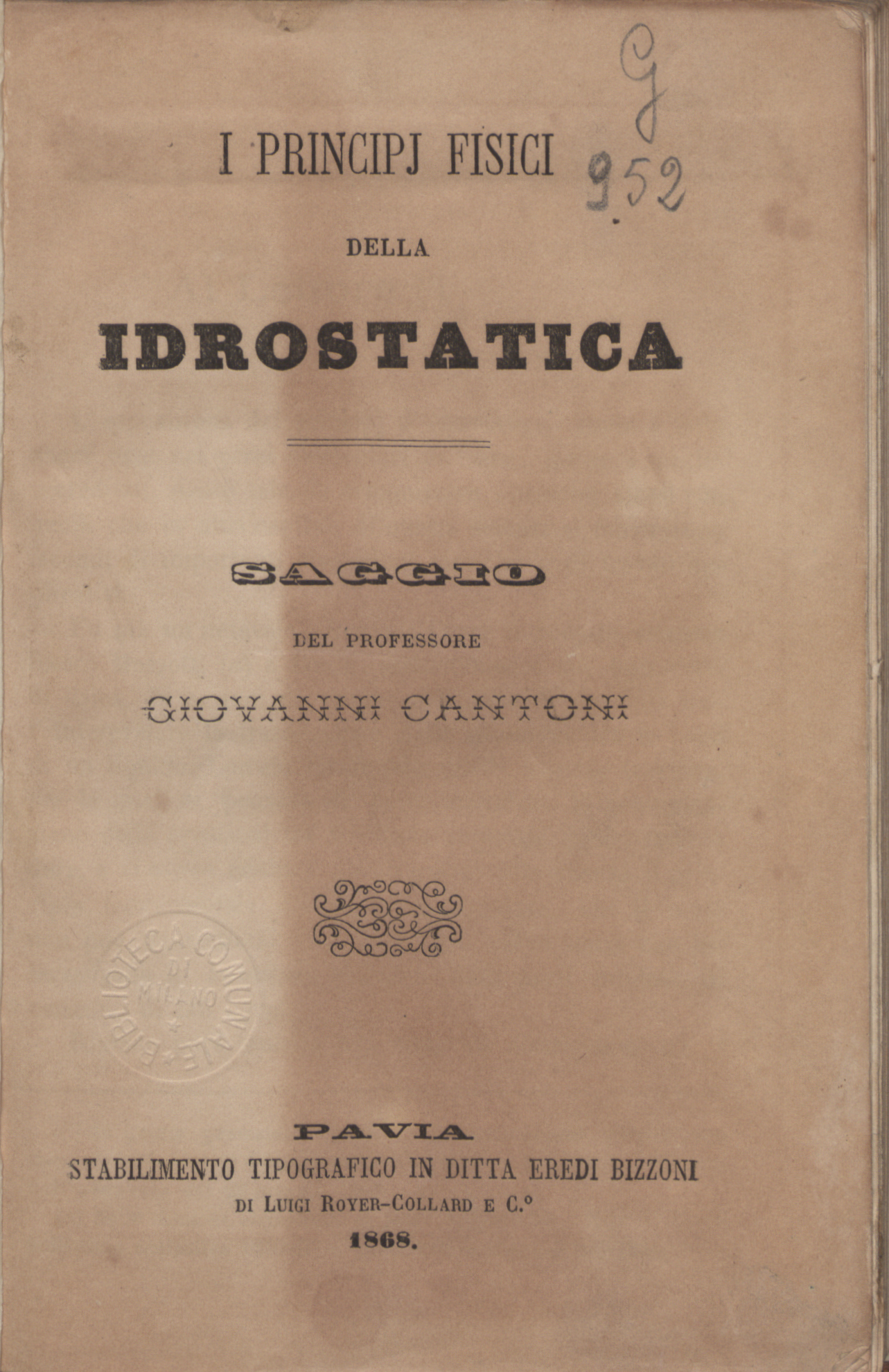
I principj fisici della idrostatica (1868)

- Lezioni su le condizioni fisiche della elasticità, 1867 – Lessons on the physical conditions of elasticity.
- Lezioni di fisica (in Italian). Milano: Vallardi. 1866.
- I principj fisici della idrostatica. Pavia. 1868 – via Stabilimento tipografico in ditta eredi Bizzoni di Luigi Royer-Collard.
- Su alcuni principj di elettrostatica, 1873 – On some principles of electrostatics.
- Elementi di fisica (in Italian). Milano: Vallardi. 1885.
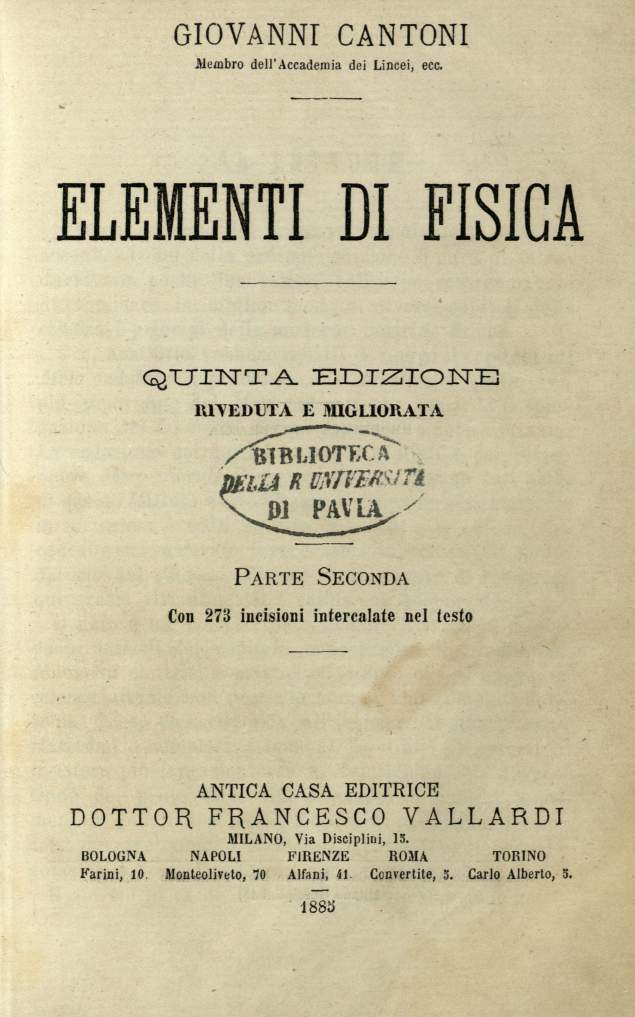
Elementi di fisica, 1885
