= Sergei Vorzhev =

Russian artist (1950–2023)

- Сергей Воржев
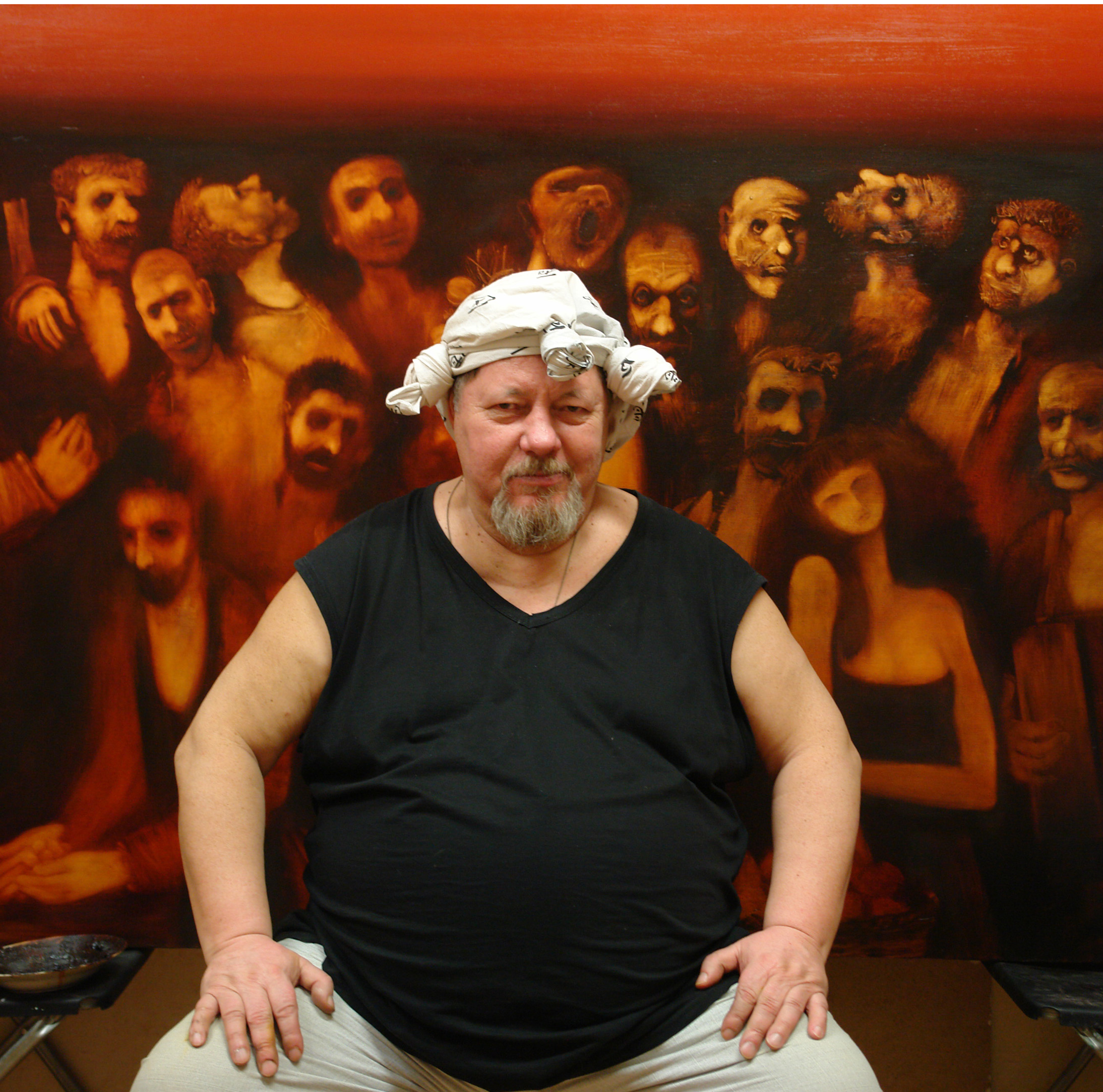
- Vorzhev in 2011
- Born: 21 February 1950; Varenikovskaya, Russian SFSR, USSR
- Died: 19 May 2023 (aged 73); Krasnodar, Russia
- Education: Kuban State University
- Known for: painting
- Awards: Honored Painter of the Russian Federation, The Gentleman of an award of Peter Great I degrees
- Website: http://www.vorzhev.com/

Sergei Dmitrievich Vorzhev (Russian: Сергей Дмитриевич Воржев; 21 February 1950 – 19 May 2023) was a Russian visual artist based in Krasnodar.

== Biography ==
Sergei Dmitrievich Vorzhev was born on 21 February 1950 in Varenikovskaya Cossack village of Krasnodar Region. In 1972 he graduated from the Faculty of Art of Kuban State University. He was a member of the Russia's Painters union since 1983.

In the subjects of his works he falls back upon the history of Kuban, represents landscapes and wild nature of his smaller motherland, applying very often the ethnic surrealism style. One of his favorite motifs is the marapatsutsa ("my solar chariot").

A participant of more than 40 exhibitions of all levels, including 14 international, since 1977. More than 10 personal exhibitions. His works were bought by the Krasnodar Art museum, Maikop Art museum, Russian Ministry of Culture, some of them are now in private collections in United States, Japan, Singapore, New Zealand, Canada, Germany, Austria, Italy, France, Russia.

Vorzhev died on 19 May 2023, at the age of 73.

== Works ==
- "House of antiquarian" (1980);
- "Sign of the sea" (1986);
- series "Marapatsutsa" (1984–1998);
- series "UFO" (1984–2001);
- series "Flown away bird Kuban" (1987–2000);
- series "Kuban angels" (1996–2000);
- series "Solyony farm-stead" (1990–2001);
- "Year of the rooster" (1994);
- series "Ekaterinodar" (1979–2001);
- series "Coast of Aphrodite" (1996–2000).

== Exhibitions ==
- 1977. Republican exhibition of picture and watercolors. Leningrad, Central Exhibition Hall
- 1980. Republican exhibition "Soviet Russia". Moscow, Central Exhibition Hall
- 1981. All-Union youth exhibition. Tashkent, Central Exhibition Hall
- 1984. All-Union exhibition of young artists. Moscow, USSR Academy of Arts
- 1986. Republican exhibition "Soviet Russia". Moscow, Central Exhibition Hall
- 1987. "Drawings of Kuban". Belgrade, Yugoslavia
- 1989. International exhibition "Starway of the Mankind". Moscow, Central Exhibition Hall
- 1990. International exhibition "Starway of the mankind". Travelling exhibition in United States cities
- 1990. "Modern art of Kuban". Mimara Museum, Zagreb, Croatia
- 1991. Personal exhibition, INTERPRESSCENTER, Warsaw, Poland
- 1991. International exhibition "To the stars". Moscow, Central House of Artist
- 1991–1993 International exhibition "To the stars". Travelling exhibition in United States cities and towns
- 1993. Exhibition of Kuban artists "The passing Millennium". Moscow, Central House of Artist
- 1994. Exhibition of Russian artists "Multifaced Russia". Moscow, Russian Academy of Arts
- 1994. Third International biennale of easel graphics "Kaliningrad-Koenigsberg-94»
- 1996. Personal exhibition, Hamburg, Germany
- 1996. Personal exhibition, ASTON Trading GmbH, Hamburg, Germany
- 1998. Regional exhibition "South of Russia – 98", Krasnodar, Russia
- 1998. "Modern arts festival", Sochi, Russia
- 1999. Russian exhibition "Russia – 99", Moscow
- 1999. Personal exhibition. Italy, Verona, gallery "La Torretta»
- 2001. Personal exhibition, Stuttgart, Germany
- 2001. Exhibition of Kuban artists "Nu – 2001", Krasnodar
- 2001. Biennale 2001, Central Exhibition Hall, Krasnodar
- 2002. "Art-Ekaterina 2002", Central Exhibition Hall, Krasnodar
- 2002. Personal exhibition of graphics, gallery "South", Krasnodar, Russia
- 2003. The exhibition project "Moscow-Krasnodar", Krasnodar, Russia
- 2003. Regional exhibition "The South of Russia ", Krasnodar, Russia
- 2003. The international biennial "Kuban-Abkhazia", Krasnodar, Russia
- 2004. Regional exhibition "The South of Russia ", Krasnodar, Russia
- 2005. Exhibition "Art of artists of Kuban ", St.Petersburg, Russia
- 2005. The All-Russia art exhibition, devoted to Day of the Victory, Krasnodar, Russia
- 2006. Republican art exhibition, the Central House of the Artist, Moscow, Russia
- 2007. Regional exhibition "Blessed Kuban ", Krasnodar, Russia
- 2007. Exhibition "Art of artists of Kuban ", St.Petersburg, Russia
- 2008. Exhibition "Culture of Kuban ", Hanover, Germany
- 2008. Exhibition of painting and charts "21", Krasnodar, Russia
- 2008. Regional exhibition "The South of Russia ", Krasnodar, Russia
- 2008 Personal exhibition, gallery "ART-Union", Krasnodar, Russia
- 2009. Ffirstirst International open-air UNESCO "The Earth Gold Amazons", Taman, Russia
- 2010. National exhibition "Russia-10", Moscow, Russia
- 2010. Personal exhibition, the Russian Olympic house, Vancouver, British Columbia, Canada

== Awards ==
Honored Painter of the Russian Federation since 1997. The member of the board of the Krasnodar Regional painters' union. The Gentleman of an award of Peter Great I degrees.

== Gallery ==
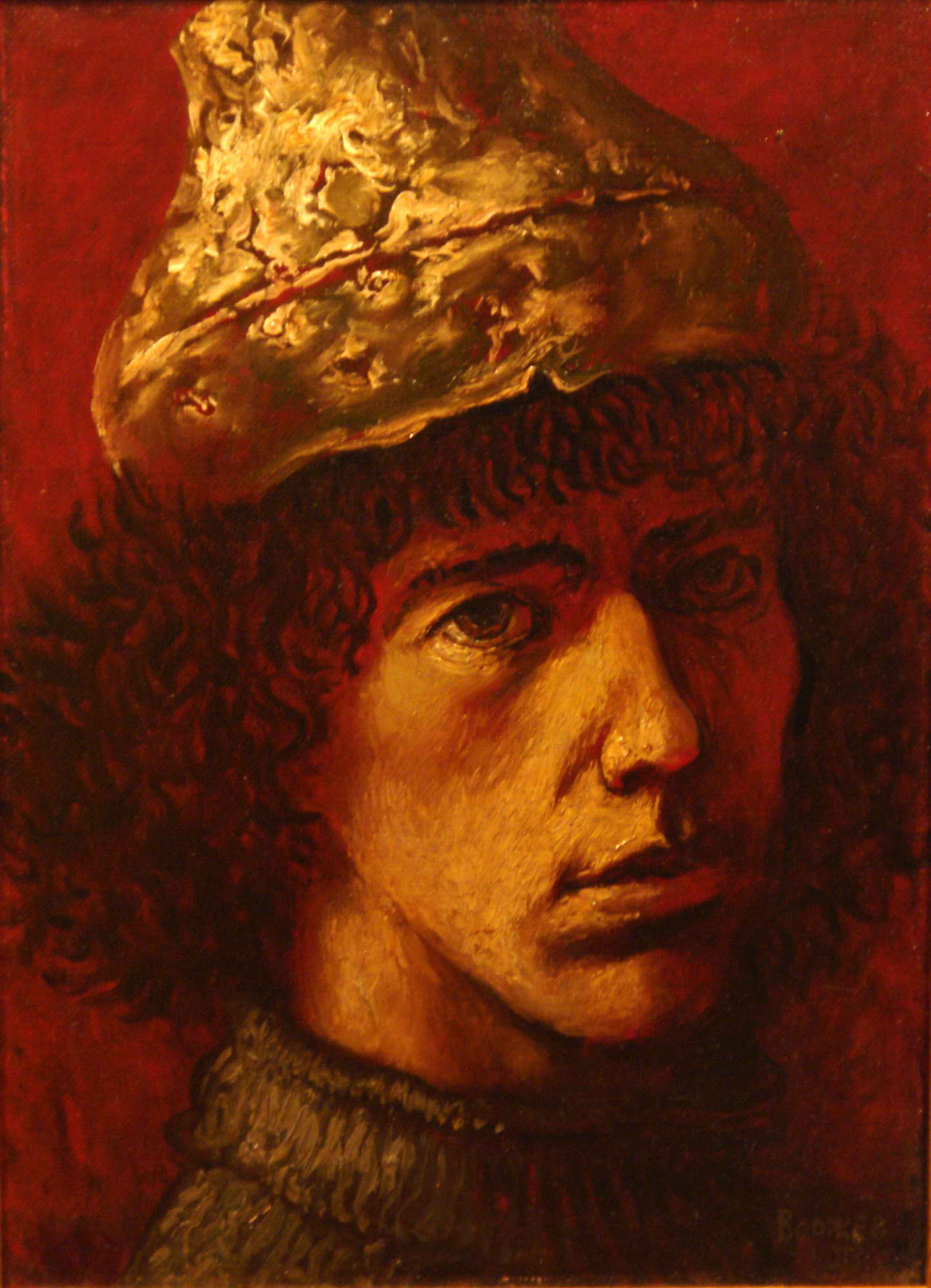
canvas, oil, 60х40 cm

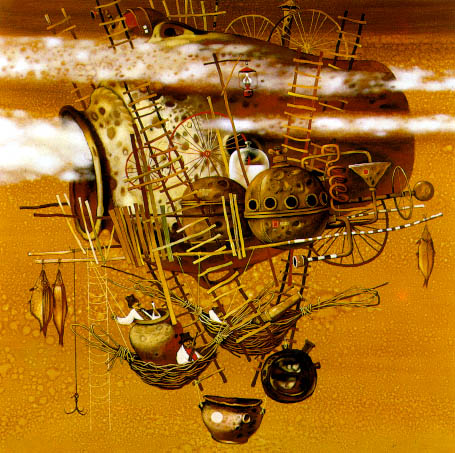
canvas, oil, 110х100 cm

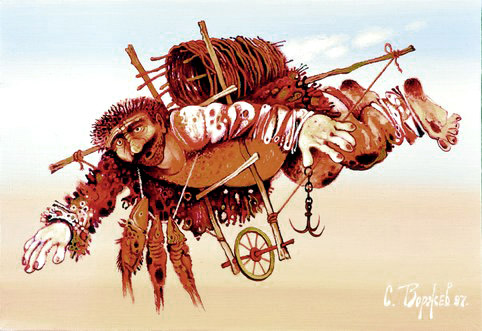
canvas, oil, 10x15 cm

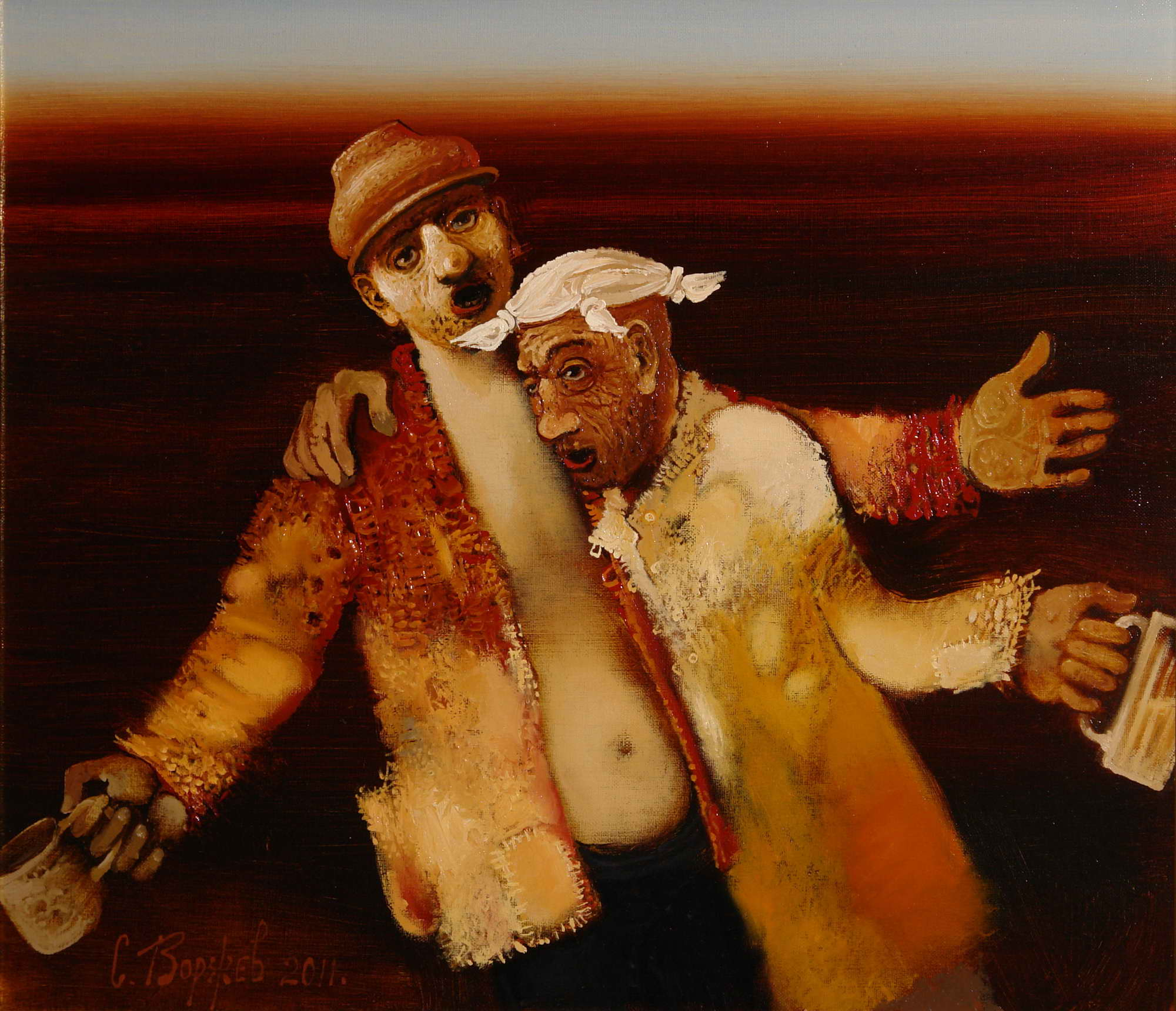
canvas, oil, 55х60 cm
