= Carlo Marangoni =

Italian physicist (1840–1925)

- Born: 29 April 1840; Pavia, Austrian Empire
- Died: 14 April 1925 (aged 84); Florence, Italy
- Education: Università degli Studi di Pavia
- Known for: Marangoni effect Marangoni number
- Scientific career
- Fields: Physics; Meteorology
- Workplaces: Liceo Dante, Florence
- Doctoral advisor: Giovanni Cantoni

Carlo Giuseppe Matteo Marangoni (29 April 1840 – 14 April 1925) was an Italian physicist. He primarily studied surface phenomena in liquids, and the Marangoni effect and the Marangoni number are named after him. He also contributed to meteorology and invented a Nefoscopio to observe clouds.

== Biography ==
Marangoni graduated in 1865 from the University of Pavia under the supervision of Giovanni Cantoni with a dissertation entitled "Sull' espansione delle gocce liquide" ("On the spreading of liquid droplets").

He then moved to Florence where he first worked at the "Museo di Fisica" (1866) and later at the Liceo Dante (1870), where he held the position of High School Physics Teacher for 45 years until retirement in 1916.

== Aspirator and compressor ==
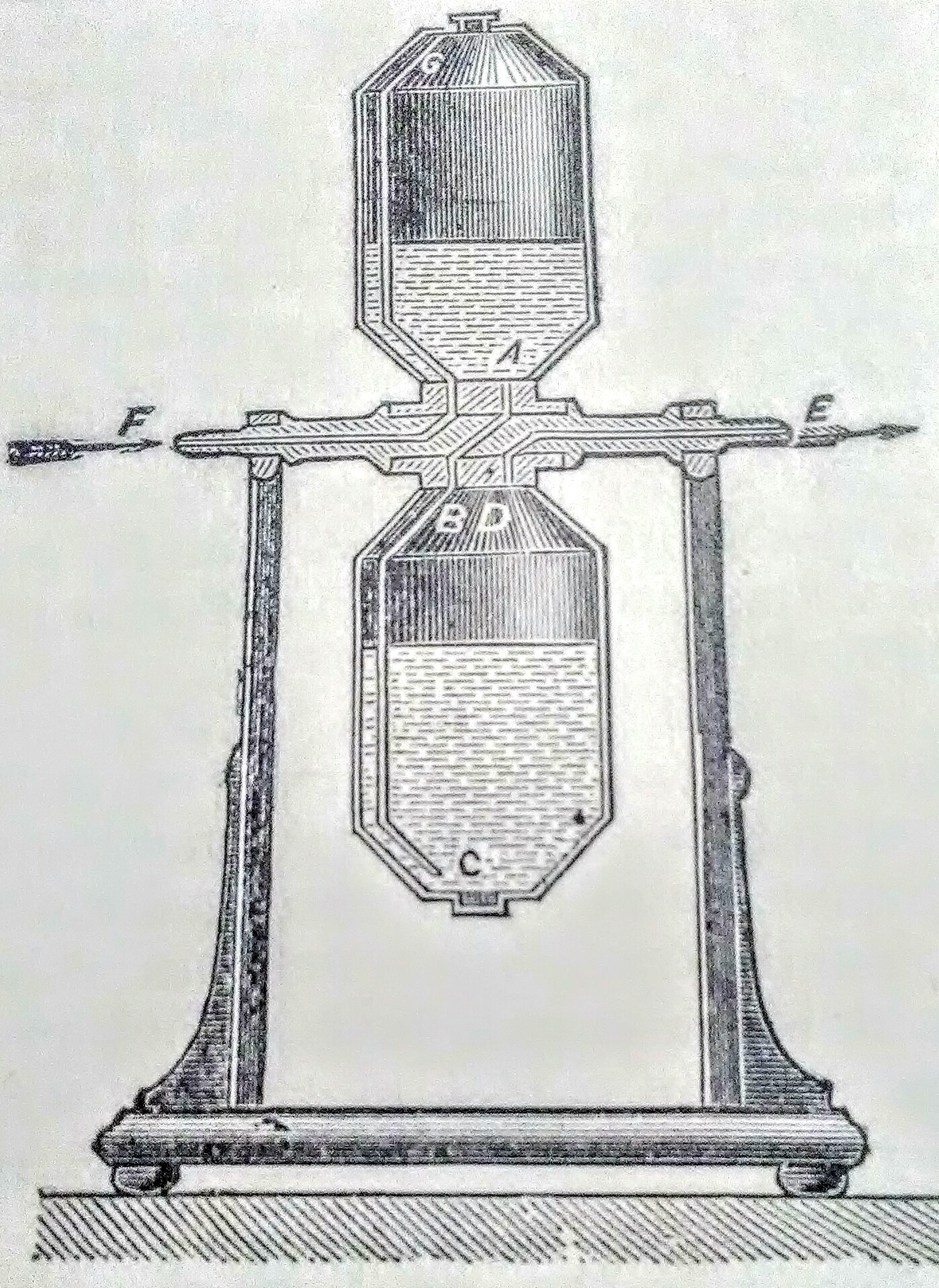
Aspirator and Compressor by Carlo Marangoni

Marangoni simplified the aspirator for the measurement of gas. A common flaw in aspirator were inaccurate measurements caused by ascending of air or gas through descending liquid. The perfected device uses a couple of vessels attached to a fixed horizontal shaft, FE, which rests on two erect supports. The shaft has various passages which conducts the functions of the taps. The water of the above receptacle releases into the bottom receptacle by passage A, and through the tube, BC, issuing at the lowest extremity at C. The air within the bottom vessel is omitted by the passage DE, cut into the shaft, meanwhile the air or gas is aspirated in the identical ratio by the passage, FG.
