= Diffusiophoresis and diffusioosmosis =

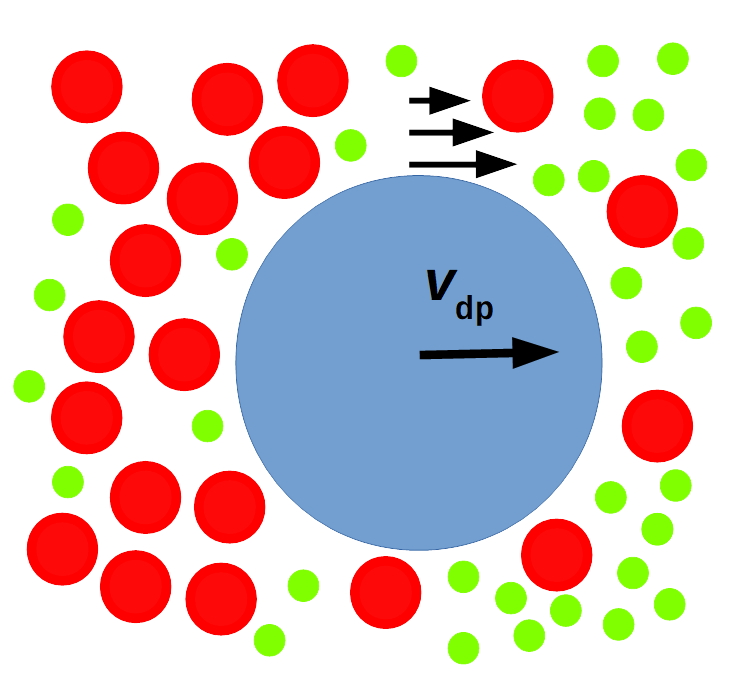
Schematic illustrating diffusiophoretic motion of a colloidal particle (blue) in a concentration gradient of a solute (red). Note that there is also a concentration gradient of the solvent (green). The particle is moving a diffusiophoretic velocity ${\bf v}_\text{dp}$, in a fluid that is stationary far from the particle. The fluid velocity decays from ${\bf v}_\text{dp}$ for fluid in contact with the surface of the particle, to near zero, within the interface at the particle's surface.

Diffusiophoresis is the spontaneous motion of colloidal particles or molecules in a fluid, induced by a concentration gradient of a different substance. In other words, it is motion of one species, A, in response to a concentration gradient in another species, B. Typically, A is colloidal particles which are in aqueous solution in which B is a dissolved salt such as sodium chloride, and so the particles of A are much larger than the ions of B. But both A and B could be polymer molecules, and B could be a small molecule. For example, concentration gradients in ethanol solutions in water move 1 μm diameter colloidal particles with diffusiophoretic velocities ${\bf v}_\text{dp}$ of order 0.1 to 1 μm/s, the movement is towards regions of the solution with lower ethanol concentration (and so higher water concentration). Both species A and B will typically be diffusing but diffusiophoresis is distinct from simple diffusion: in simple diffusion a species A moves down a gradient in its own concentration.

Diffusioosmosis, also referred to as capillary osmosis, is flow of a solution relative to a fixed wall or pore surface, where the flow is driven by a concentration gradient in the solution. This is distinct from flow relative to a surface driven by a gradient in the hydrostatic pressure in the fluid. In diffusioosmosis the hydrostatic pressure is uniform and the flow is due to a concentration gradient.

Diffusioosmosis and diffusiophoresis are essentially the same phenomenon. They are both relative motion of a surface and a solution, driven by a concentration gradient in the solution. This motion is called diffusiophoresis when the solution is considered static with particles moving in it due to relative motion of the fluid at the surface of these particles. The term diffusioosmosis is used when the surface is viewed as static, and the solution flows.

A well studied example of diffusiophoresis is the motion of colloidal particles in an aqueous solution of an electrolyte solution, where a gradient in the concentration of the electrolyte causes motion of the colloidal particles. Colloidal particles may be hundred of nanometres or larger in diameter, while the interfacial double layer region at the surface of the colloidal particle will be of order the Debye length wide, and this is typically only nanometres. So here, the interfacial width is much smaller than the size of the particle, and then the gradient in the smaller species drives diffusiophoretic motion of the colloidal particles largely through motion in the interfacial double layer.

Diffusiophoresis was first studied by Derjaguin and coworkers in 1947.

== Applications of diffusiophoresis ==
Diffusiophoresis, by definition, moves colloidal particles, and so the applications of diffusiophoresis are to situations where we want to move colloidal particles. Colloidal particles are typically between 10 nanometres and a few micrometres in size. Simple diffusion of colloids is fast on length scales of a few micrometres, and so diffusiophoresis would not be useful, whereas on length scales larger than millimetres, diffusiophoresis may be slow as its speed decreases with decreasing size of the solute concentration gradient. Thus, typically diffusiophoresis is employed on length scales approximately in the range a micrometre to a millimetre. Applications include moving particles into or out of pores of that size, and helping or inhibiting mixing of colloidal particles.

In addition, solid surfaces that are slowly dissolving will create concentration gradients near them, and these gradients may drive movement of colloidal particles towards or away from the surface. This was studied by Prieve in the context of latex particles being pulled towards, and coating, a dissolving steel surface.

== Relation to thermophoresis, multicomponent diffusion and the Marangoni effect ==
Diffusiophoresis is an analogous phenomenon to thermophoresis, where a species A moves in response to a temperature gradient. Both diffusiophoresis and thermophoresis are governed by Onsager reciprocal relations. Simply speaking, a gradient in any thermodynamic quantity, such as the concentration of any species, or temperature, will drive motion of all thermodynamic quantities, i.e., motion of all species present, and a temperature flux. Each gradient provides a thermodynamic force that moves the species present, and the Onsager reciprocal relations govern the relationship between the forces and the motions.

Diffusiophoresis is a special case of multicomponent diffusion. Multicomponent diffusion is diffusion in mixtures, and diffusiophoresis is the special case where we are interested in the movement of one species that is usually a colloidal particle, in a gradient of a much smaller species, such as dissolved salt such as sodium chloride in water. or a miscible liquid, such as ethanol in water. Thus diffusiophoresis always occurs in a mixture, typically a three-component mixture of water, salt and a colloidal species, and we are interested in the cross-interaction between the salt and the colloidal particle.

It is the very large difference in size between the colloidal particle, which may be 1μm across, and the size of the ions or molecules, which are less than 1 nm across, that makes diffusiophoresis closely related to diffusioosomosis at a flat surface. In both cases the forces that drive the motion are largely localised to the interfacial region, which is a few molecules across and so typically of order a nanometer across. Over distances of order a nanometer, there is little difference between the surface of a colloidal particle 1 μm across, and a flat surface.

Diffusioosmosis is flow of a fluid at a solid surface, or in other words, flow at a solid/fluid interface. The Marangoni effect is flow at a fluid/fluid interface. So the two phenomena are analogous with the difference being that in diffusioosmosis one of the phases is a solid. Both diffusioosmosis and the Marangoni effect are driven by gradients in the interfacial free energy, i.e., in both cases the induced velocities are zero if the interfacial free energy is uniform in space, and in both cases if there are gradients the velocities are directed along the direction of increasing interfacial free energy.

== Theory for diffusioosmotic flow of a solution ==
In diffusioosmosis, for a surface at rest the velocity increases from zero at the surface to the diffusioosmotic velocity, over the width of the interface between the surface and the solution. Beyond this distance, the diffusioosmotic velocity does not vary with distance from the surface. The driving force for diffusioosmosis is thermodynamic, i.e., it acts to reduce the free energy if the system, and so the direction of flow is away from surface regions of low surface free energy, and towards regions of high surface free energy. For a solute that adsorbs at surface, diffusioosmotic flow is away from regions of high solute concentration, while for solutes that are repelled by the surface, flow is away from regions of low solute concentration.

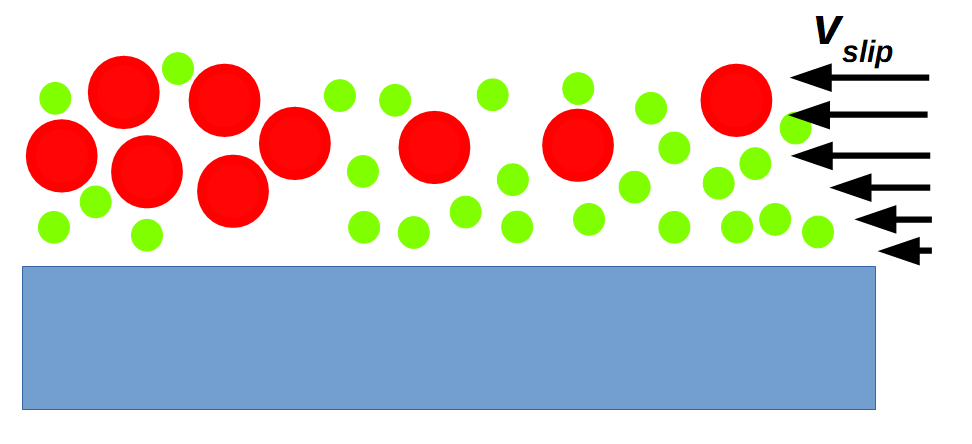
This schematic illustrates diffusioosmotic flow above a surface in contact with a solution that has a concentration gradient of a solute (red). The flow as a function of height above the surface is shown as black arrows of length proportional to the flow velocity at that height. The flow is left-to-right as this solute is repelled by the surface, and its concentration increases from left-to-right. Therefore, the surface free energy increases right-to-left, which drives flow from right-to-left.

For gradients that are not-too-large, the diffusioosmotic slip velocity, i.e., the relative flow velocity far from the surface will be proportional to the gradient in the concentration gradient

$${\bf v}_\text{slip}=-K\nabla c_\text{sol}$$

where $K$ is a diffusioosmotic coefficient, and $c_\text{sol}$ is the solute concentration. When the solute is ideal and interacts with a surface in the x–y plane at $z=0$ via a potential $\phi_\text{solute}(z)$, the coefficient $K$ is given by

$$K=\frac{kT}{\eta}\int_0^{\infty}z\left[\exp(-\phi_\text{solute}/kT)-1\right]{\rm d}z$$

where $k$ is the Boltzmann constant, $T$ is the absolute temperature, and $\eta$ is the viscosity in the interfacial region, assumed to be constant in the interface. This expression assumes that the fluid velocity for fluid in contact with the surface is forced to be zero, by interaction between the fluid and the wall. This is called the no-slip condition.

To understand these expressions better, we can consider a very simple model, where the surface simply excludes an ideal solute from an interface of width $R$, this is would be the Asakura–Oosawa model of an ideal polymer against a hard wall. Then the integral is simply $-(1/2)R^2$ and the diffusioosmotic slip velocity

$${\bf v}_\text{slip}=\frac{kTR^2}{2\eta}\nabla c_\text{sol}$$

Note that the slip velocity is directed towards increasing solute concentrations.

A particle much larger than $R$ moves with a diffusiophoretic velocity ${\bf v}_\text{dp}=-{\bf v}_\text{slip}$ relative to the surrounding solution. So diffusiophoresis moves particles towards lower solute concentrations, in this case.

=== Derivation of diffusioosmotic velocity from Stokes flow ===
In this simple model, ${\bf v}_\text{slip}$ can also be derived directly from the expression for fluid flow in the Stokes limit for an incompressible fluid, which is

$$\eta\nabla^2{\bf u}=\nabla p$$

for ${\bf u}$ the fluid flow velocity and $p$ the pressure. We consider an infinite surface in the $xy$ plane at $z=0$, and enforce stick boundary conditions there, i.e., ${\bf u}(x,y,z=0)=(0,0,0)$. We take the concentration gradient to be along the $x$ axis, i.e., $\nabla c_\text{sol}=(\partial c_\text{sol}/\partial x,0,0)$. Then the only non-zero component of the flow velocity ${\bf u}$ is along x, $u_x$, and it depends only on height $z$. So the only non-zero component of the Stokes' equation is

$$\eta\frac{\partial ^2u_x(z)}{\partial z^2}=\frac{\partial p}{\partial x}$$

In diffusioosmosis, in the bulk of the fluid (i.e., outside the interface) the hydrostatic pressure is assumed to be uniform (as we expect any gradients to relax away by fluid flow) and so in bulk

$$\text{In bulk:}~~~~~~  p=\Pi+p_\text{solv}=\text{constant}$$

for $p_\text{solv}$ the solvent's contribution to the hydrostatic pressure, and $\Pi$ the contribution of the solute, called the osmotic pressure. Thus in the bulk the gradients obey

$$\text{In bulk:}~~~~~~  0=\frac{\partial \Pi}{\partial x}+\frac{\partial p_\text{solv}}{\partial x}$$

As we have assumed the solute is ideal, $\Pi= kTc_\text{sol}$, and so

$$\text{In bulk:}~~~~~~ \frac{\partial p_\text{solv}}{\partial x}=-kT\frac{\partial c_\text{sol}}{\partial x}$$

Our solute is excluded from a region of width $R$ (the interfacial region) from the surface, and so in interface $\Pi=0$, and so there $p=p_\text{solv}$. Assuming continuity of the solvent contribution into the interface we have a gradient of the hydrostatic pressure in the interface

$$\text{In interface:}~~~~~~\frac{\partial p }{\partial x}= \frac{\partial p_\text{solv}}{\partial x}=-kT\frac{\partial c_\text{sol}}{\partial x}$$

i.e., in the interface there is a gradient of the hydrostatic pressure equal to the negative of the bulk gradient in the osmotic pressure. It is this gradient in the interface in the hydrostatic pressure $p$ that creates the diffusioosmotic flow. Now that we have $\partial p/\partial x$, we can substitute into the Stokes equation, and integrate twice, then

$$\text{In interface:}~~~~~~u_x(z)= -\frac{kT z^2}{2\eta}\frac{\partial c_\text{sol}}{\partial x}+Az+B$$
$$\text{In bulk:}~~~~~~u_x(z)=Cz+D$$

where $A$, $B$, $C$ and $D$ are integration constants. Far from the surface the flow velocity must be a constant, so $C=0$. We have imposed zero flow velocity at $z=0$, so $B=0$. Then imposing continuity where the interface meets the bulk, i.e., forcing $u_x(z)$ and $\partial u_x(z)/\partial z$ to be continuous at $z=R$ we determine $A$ and $D$, and so get

$$\text{In interface:}~~~~~~u_x(z)= \frac{kTR^2}{2\eta}\left(\frac{\partial c_\text{sol}}{\partial x}\right)\left(\frac{2z}{R}-\frac{z^2}{R^2}\right)$$
$$\text{In bulk:}~~~~~~u_x(z)=\frac{kTR^2}{2\eta}\left(\frac{\partial c_\text{sol}}{\partial x}\right)=v_\text{slip}$$

Which gives, as it should, the same expression for the slip velocity, as above. This result is for a specific and very simple model, but it does illustrate general features of diffusioosmoisis: 1) the hydrostatic pressure is, by definition (flow induced by pressure gradients in the bulk is a common but separate physical phenomenon) uniform in the bulk, but there is a gradient in the pressure in the interface, 2) this pressure gradient in the interface causes the velocity to vary in the direction perpendicular to the surface, and this results in a slip velocity, i.e., for the bulk of the fluid to move relative to the surface, 3) away from the interface the velocity is constant, this type of flow is sometimes called plug flow.

== Diffusiophoresis in salt solutions ==
In many applications of diffusiophoresis, the motion is driven by gradients in the concentration of a salt (electrolyte) concentration, such as sodium chloride in water. Colloidal particles in water are typically charged, and there is an electrostatic potential, called a zeta potential at their surface. This charged surface of the colloidal particle interacts with a gradient in salt concentration, and this gives rise to diffusiophoretic velocity ${\bf U}$ given by

$${\bf U}=\frac{\epsilon}{\eta}\left[\frac{kT}{e}\beta\zeta+\frac{\zeta^2}{8}\right]\nabla \ln c_\text{salt}$$

where $\epsilon$ is the permittivity of water, $\eta$ is the viscosity of water, $\zeta$ is the zeta potential of the colloidal particle in the salt solution, $\beta=(D_+-D_-)/(D_++D_-)$ is the reduced difference between the diffusion constant of the positively charged ion, $D_+$, and the diffusion constant of the negatively charged ion, $D_-$, and $c_\text{salt}$ is the salt concentration. $\nabla \ln c_\text{salt}$ is the gradient, i.e., rate of change with position, of the logarithm of the salt concentration, which is equivalent to the rate of change of the salt concentration, divided by the salt concentration – it is effectively one over the distance over which the concentration decreases by a factor of e. The above equation is approximate, and only valid for 1:1 electrolytes such as sodium chloride.

Note that there are two contributions to diffusiophoresis of a charged particle in a salt gradient, which give rise to the two terms in the above equation for ${\bf U}$. The first is due to the fact that whenever there is a salt concentration gradient, then unless the diffusion constants of the positive and negative ions are exactly equal to each other, there is an electric field, i.e., the gradient acts a little like a capacitor. This electric field generated by the salt gradient drives electrophoresis of the charged particle, just as an externally applied electric field does. This gives rise to the first term in the equation above, i.e., diffusiophoresis at a velocity $(\epsilon/\eta)(kT/e)\beta\zeta\nabla \ln c_\text{salt}$.

The second part is due to the surface free energy of the surface of a charged particle, decreasing with increasing salt concentration, this is a similar mechanism to that found in diffusiophoresis in gradients of neutrial substances. This gives rise to the second part of the diffusiophoretic velocity $(\epsilon\zeta^2/8\eta)\nabla \ln c_\text{salt}$. Note that this simple theory predicts that this contribution to the diffusiophoretic motion is always up a salt concentration gradient, it always moves particles towards higher salt concentration. By contrast, the sign of the electric-field contribution to diffusiophoresis depends on the sign of $\beta\zeta$. So for example, for a negatively charged particle, $\zeta<0$, and if the positively charged ions diffuse faster than the negatively charged ones, then this term will push particles down a salt gradient, but if it is the negatively charged ions that diffuse faster, then this term pushes the particles up the salt gradient.

== Practical applications ==
A group from Princeton University reported the application of diffusiophoresis to water purification. Contaminated water is treated with CO_{2} to create carbonic acid, and to split the water into a waste stream and a potable water stream. This allows for easy ionic separation of suspended particles. This has huge energy cost and time savings opportunity to make drinking water safe compared to traditional water filtration methods for dirty water sources.

== See also ==
- Electrokinetic phenomena
- Electrophoresis
- Marangoni effect – the analog of diffusioosmosis at a fluid/fluid interface
- Thermophoresis
