= Kuban State University =

State university in Russia

Coordinates: 45°1′10″N 39°1′51″E

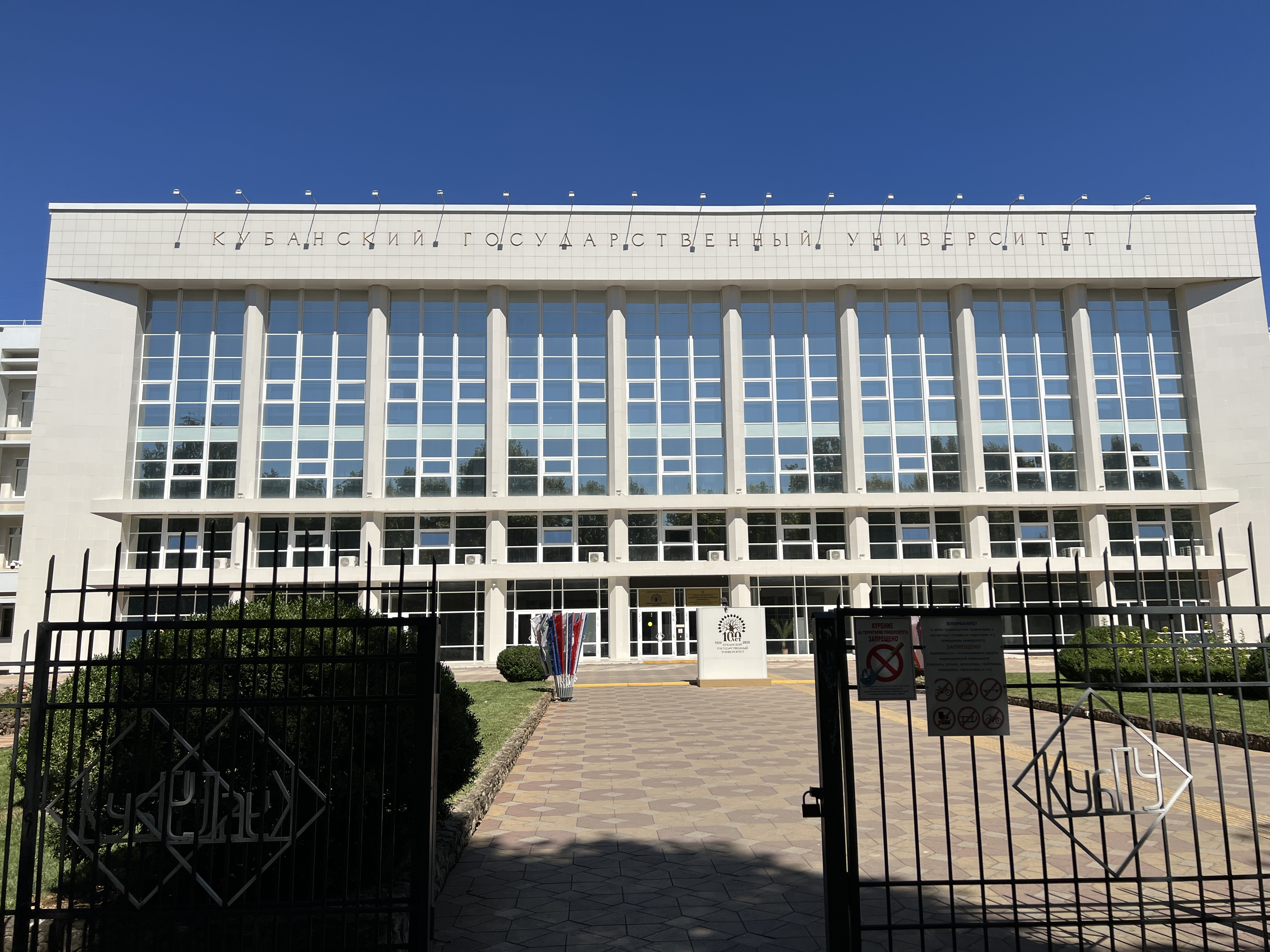
- Other names: KubSU
- Type: State
- Established: September 19, 1920
- President: Mikhail B. Astapov
- Academic staff: 1,300
- Location: 149 Stavropolskaya st., Krasnodar, Russian Federation, ph. +78612199501, Krasnodar, Russia
- Campus: Urban
- Website: http://www.kubsu.ru

University rankings

Regional – Overall
- QS Emerging Europe and Central Asia: 401-450 (2022)

The Kuban State University (Russian: Кубанский государственный университет, romanized: Kubansky gosudarstvenny universitet, abbreviated as KubSU or KubGU, Russian: КубГУ) is a university in Krasnodar, in the Kuban area of southern Russia. It was founded on September 19, 1920, and since then it has trained over 100,000 specialists, including over 1,000 international students.

== Memberships and recognition ==
KubSU is a participant in the Black Sea Economic Cooperation (BSEC). The KubSU president from 1982 to 2008 was V.A. Babeshko, a full member of the Russian Academy of Sciences, and a laureate of the Russian State Prize.

== Academics ==
KubSU is a complex of 16 branches and over 40 educational and research centers. The KubSU branches are based in southern Russia: Armavir, Gelendzhik, Goryachy Klyuch, Korenovsk, Kropotkin, Leningradskaya stanitsa, Novorossiysk, Otradnenskaya stanitsa, Pavlovskaya, Stavropol, Tikhoretsk, and Ust'-Labinsk.

Over 8,000 students study at the KubSU affiliates in seven specialties:

- Law
- Accounting and audit
- State and municipal management
- Finance, credit and currency circulation
- Philology. Teacher of two foreign languages
- Psychology
- Fine arts and drawing

KubSU incorporates over 30 educational and research centers:

- State Research Center for Forecasting and Prevention of Geological and Man-Caused Disasters
- Regional Northern Caucasus Education-Research Center for Information Security
- Center of International Educational Programs
- Internet Center and others.

KubSU has a system of additional education:

- inter-branch regional center for professional skills improvement and personnel retraining
- department of professional skills improvement for teachers of specialized colleges and higher education institutions with 1000 candidates admitted annually
- Kuban branch of the Rostov Institute for retraining and professional skills improvement for teachers of the humanities and social sciences
- “university” educational and methodical center for additional education services and preparatory training, which includes 24 education subdivisions

== Faculties ==
The university comprises 17 faculties:

- Mathematics
- Applied Informatics
- Physics and Technology
- Chemistry
- Biology
- Geography
- History, Sociology and International Relations
- Law
- Philology
- Romano-Germanic Philology
- Journalism
- Fine Arts and Drawing
- Architecture and Design
- Economics
- Management and Psychology
- Faculty of Pedagogy, Psychology and Communication Sciences
- Computer Technologies and Applied Mathematics

== Research work and scientific study ==
KubSU carries out research work on scientific and technical programs, Russian and international projects.

There are 15 higher degree boards, including 13 higher doctoral boards. More than 400 postgraduates and people working for a higher doctoral degree attend postgraduate and postdoctoral studies.

The university is responsible for the implementation of regional programs on the assessment of the seismicity of the Krasnodar region and reducing the risk of natural disasters. This work is performed under the order of the Administration and the Legislative Assembly of the Krasnodar region.

The Kuban State University comprises 15 scientific-research institutes, the university scientific-technological park, and 12 educational-and-research centers. The university's science-intensive products have been exhibited at Russian and foreign exhibitions in Paris, Brussels, and Milan. KubSU possesses facilities for conducting scientific experiments; laboratories and testing grounds in the area of Gelendzhik and the Lago-Naki plateau provide students with the opportunity to carry out scientific experiments and field studies.

== Faculty ==
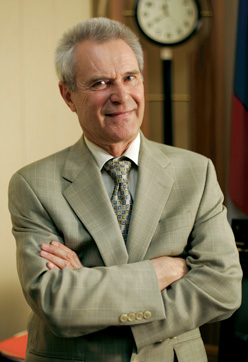
Vladimir A. Babeshko is the former president of Kuban State University

Over 1,300 lecturers work at the university, including three full members of the Russian Academy of Science, over 40 members and associate members of other Russian academies, prize laureates and honoured scientists.

== Student life ==
In 85 years over 100,000 students have graduated from KubSU, including 1,000 foreign students.

The Students’ Organization of KubSU comprises 17 trade union organizations of the university faculties. The trade union committee consists of five boards: organizational issues, housing, information, culture and education, and sports and health improvement. The activities of the trade union organization are primarily aimed at the protection of its members’ rights, representation of their interests to the KubSU administration.

The Youth Cultural and Leisure Center was founded 1 December 1994, and has since then held over 400 concerts, games, exhibitions, etc. Clubs include:

- theatre club
- vocal-choral studio
- pop dances and modern plastic arts studios
- fine arts studio

== Internet center and library ==
The Internet Center was opened in KubSU with the support of the “Open Society” Institute (Soros Foundation). It has become the center of the regional information network with high-speed connection combining educational, scientific and cultural resources of the Krasnodar region (KUBANnet).

The university participates in the Russian-American project aimed at developing the Russian-American cooperation through the application of new generation telecommunication technologies: MIRNET. The participation of Kuban University in the project is provided with a direct communication channel with the USA which makes it possible to establish visual communication between scientists working in higher education institutions and scientific-research centers of Russia and the USA.

The library has more than one million books. It has a collection of 7,000 rare books dating back to the 17th to early 20th centuries, as well as a collection of works of KubSU scientists.

== Partnerships and academic relations ==
The university has more than 50 international agreements with educational institutes of different countries. International relations have been developing with universities and institutes in Italy, Germany, the US, the Great Britain, France, Greece, and Turkey.

The Kuban State University trains foreign citizens: every year up to 200 students from the countries of Europe, America, CIS, Asia and the Middle East attend. The university is the only institute of the south of Russia where student groups from the US, the Great Britain, Belgium and Austria study. Every year over 40 students of the university go to foreign educational institutions.

The university is a member of the Eurasian Association: It carries out research on international and Russian grants. In 1999, KubSU was elected a member of the US Incorporated Research Institutions for Seismology (IRIS).

== Notable alumni ==
- Artist Sergei Vorzhev
- Artist Israel Tsvaygenbaum
- editor-in-chief RT Margarita Simonyan
- TV Presenter Maria Minogarova
- former Channel One Russia journalist Marina Ovsyannikova
- Polina Lukyanenkova (born 1998), Russian long jumper
- Footballer Matvey Safonov

== High-profile events ==
According to the results of Dissernet examinations, the rector Mikhail Astapov and several teachers of KubSU were found to have dissertations containing signs of violation of academic ethics (plagiarism). In total, about 50 similar dissertations were discovered at KubSU.

In 2008 and 2009, a corruption scandal erupted around a physical education teacher Vitali Doroshenko.

On April 11, 2013, based on materials from the department’s operational investigative activities, a criminal case was initiated under Part 3 of Art. 159 of the Criminal Code of the Russian Federation “Fraud on an especially large scale” against professor of Kuban State University Mikhail Savva. Many of Savva’s supporters and human rights activists consider the case to be politically ordered, since the professor wrote an article criticizing the methods of the FSB’s work with Krasnodar NGOs. Among the heroes of the article was a non-profit organization representing the Tajik diaspora. According to FederalPress, on April 15, Savva was supposed to speak at the Public Chamber of Russia at a hearing on inspections of NGOs by security forces, and his arrest may be due to the reluctance of the Kuban security forces to “wash dirty linen in public.” The article was published after his arrest.

The chairman of the Public Chamber commission on problems of citizen safety and interaction with the system of judicial and law enforcement agencies, Anatoly Kucherena, then called Savva’s detention “an excessive precaution.” The Human Rights Council under the President of Russia also spoke out in support of Savva. The release of the professor from the pre-trial detention center occurred thanks to the petition of the head of the Human Rights Council, Mikhail Fedotov. Later, Mikhail Savva managed to travel outside the Russian Federation.

After the Russian invasion of Ukraine began in 2022, students who publicly expressed an anti-war position were subject to pressure from the university leadership. Earlier, KubSU Rector Mikhail Astapov and dozens of university employees signed an appeal in support of the invasion. In June 2023, a 3rd year student at the Faculty of Architecture and Design, beauty blogger Maxim Belomyltsev, was expelled from the university. Later, he was detained at the entrance of the house and taken to the department, where protocols were drawn up against him under the articles “Propaganda of non-traditional sexual relationships and (or) preferences, gender reassignment” and “Public actions aimed at discrediting the use of the Armed Forces of the Russian Federation”. The official reason for expulsion was the “immoral behavior” of the student, namely the blog he kept about makeup.
