= Vladimir Damgov =

Bulgarian scientist and politician (1947–2006)

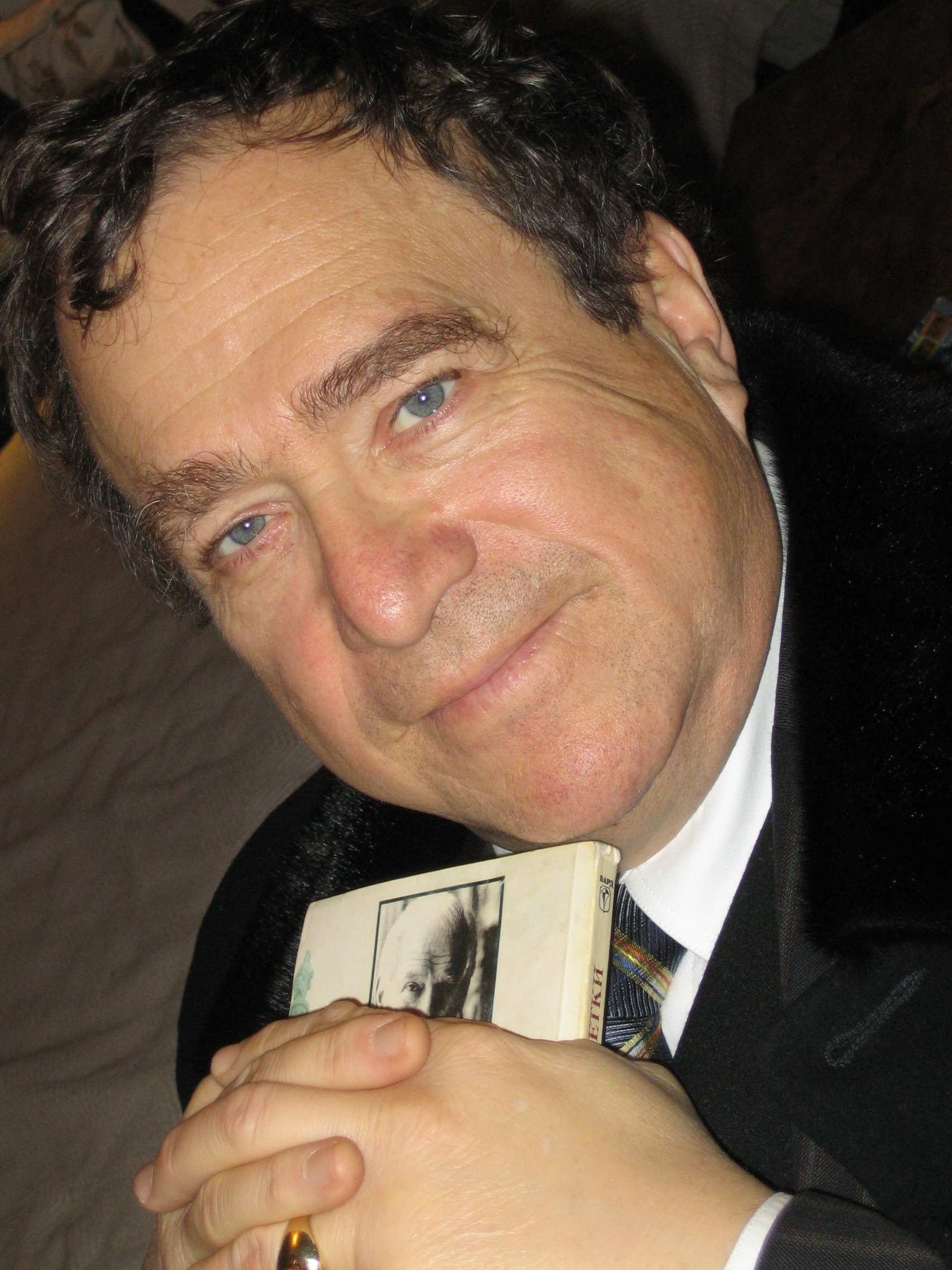
Vladimir Damgov, December 2005

Vladimir Nikolov Damgov (Bulgarian: Владимир Николов Дамгов) (November 22, 1947 – June 20, 2006) was a Bulgarian physicist, mathematician, union leader, and parliamentarian. He contributed particularly to the application of Chaos theory to mechanical and radiophysical systems as well as to space exploration and space studies.

== Biography ==
Vladimir Damgov was born in Sofia, Bulgaria, the son of a lawyer and a French language teacher. He received his early schooling in Sofia and at the Georgi Benkovski Gymnasium at Teteven, a mountain town in the Balkan Range, in the District of Lovech. He studied at Moscow Technical University, from which he graduated in 1971 with a degree in Informatics and Engineering Physics. He went on to study at M. V. Lomonossov University (Moscow State University). There, he wanted to change his major to philosophy, in order to study Bertrand Russell, but was forbidden to do so by the Bulgarian authorities. He shone at chess, earned a degree in radiophysics (1977) and, the same year, received a Ph.D. in Physics and Mathematics. He collaborated at some of the most advanced space programs at the Russian Academy of Science.

Vladimir Damgov became a Doctor of Science at the Bulgarian Academy of Sciences in 1992. He was a professor at the Space Research Institute of the Bulgarian Academy of Sciences, where he headed the Department of Nonlinear Space Dynamics. He was a visiting professor at University of Kyoto, University of Leeds, Université de Montréal and others. His colleagues voted him Scientist of Year 2001–2002. He has 17 patents and over 250 publications to his name. He was a member of the New York Academy of Science.

=== Political activities ===
Having followed a distinguished career in the Soviet Union and in Bulgaria, Damgov never joined the Communist Party. After the fall of Communism, he joined the Bulgarian Socialist Party and became a leader of the Union of Scientists in Bulgaria, of which he was a vice-president. As a scientist, he was a member of the reviewing board of the European Union Framework Program for Research and Technological Development, even though Bulgaria itself was not yet a member of the EU.

In 2005, Damgov presented himself for the parliamentary elections on the list of the Bulgarian Socialist Party in the District of Lovech, and was elected Deputy to the 40th Parliament of the Republic of Bulgaria (Narodno Sebranie). In his first weeks as a member of Parliament, he chaired an inter-party commission to investigate the severe occurrences of environmental pollution in and around the city of Stara Zagora. Vladimir Damgov was a member of the Parliamentary Commissions on Education and Research, and on Defense. He was elected Chairman of the Bulgarian Delegation to the European Defense Organization, Eurofor, Western European Union. In December 2005, less than six months after his election, Vladimir Damgov was diagnosed with acute leukemia. He died in Hanover, Germany, the 20 June 2006, before a blood stem cell transplant could be undertaken at the University Hospital (Medizinische Hochschule Hannover - MHH) there. He was buried on June 29 in his home-town of Teteven.

== Work ==
=== Book ===
- Nonlinear and Parametric Phenomena - Theory and Applications in Radiophysical and Mechanical Systems - World Scientific (Series on Nonlinear Science) - New Jersey, London, Singapore, Beijing - (2004).

=== Patents ===
- Methods and Devices for Implementation of Low-Noise Wide-Band Negative Resistances, Negative Capacitances and Negative Inductances (Patents of Republic of Bulgaria, No 25959, No 25960, No 25961, No 25971, No 29260 and No 30008).
- Method and Device for Measuring Biological Membranes (Patent of Republic of Bulgaria, No 29993).
- Multielectrode Modulation Device for Measuring the Interplanetary Plasma (Patent of the Republic of Bulgaria No 45821).
- Short-Range Autodyne System (Patent of the Republic of Bulgaria No 45520).
- Short-Range Radar (Patent of the Republic of Bulgaria No 47466).
- One-Band Modulator (Patent of the Republic of Bulgaria No 35731), with D.V. Stoyanov.
- Linear Reciprocating Electric Motor (Patent of the Republic of Bulgaria No 44194), with Y.B. Douboshinsky and M.I. Kozakov.
- Microwave Emitter (Patent of the Republic of Bulgaria No 44197), with D.B. Douboshinsky and Y.B. Douboshinsky.
- Inductive Sensor - Spectrum Analyser (Patent of the Republic of Bulgaria No 30009).

=== Main Articles in English ===
Published in (partial list):

- Advances in Space Research, Elsevier Publishers, Amsterdam, (1991).
- Earth, Moon, and Planets, Springer Verlag, Berlin (1992) with D. B. Douboshinsky, (1993).
- Aerospace Research in Bulgaria, (1994, 1996, 1997, 1998, 1999).
- Dynamical Systems and Chaos 2, Eds. J. Aizawa, S. Saito, K. Shiraiwa, World Scientific Publishing, London (1995).
- Discrete Dynamics in Nature and Society, Hindawi Publishing, New York, Cairo (1999).
- Chaos, Solitons and Fractals, University of Oxford, Oxford, UK. (2003) (2003) with Pl. Trenchev and K. Sheiretsky.
- Journal of Theoretical and Applied Mechanics, Sofia, Bulgaria (2000).
- Progress of Theoretical Physics Suppl., Kyoto, Japan (2000).
- Proceedings of the 4th Int. Symposium on Network Theory, Ljubliana, Yugoslavia (1979).
- IEEE Proceedings of Int. Symposium on Circuits and Systems, Rome, Italy (1982).
- Proceedings IX Intern. Conference on Nonlinear Oscillations, Kiev, USSR (1984).
- Proceedings 27th Midwest Symposium on Circuits and Systems, Morgantown, West Virginia, USA (1984) with D.B. Douboshinsky and Y.B. Douboshinsky.
- Proceedings 5th Intern. Symposium on Network Theory, Sarajevo, Yugoslavia (1984).
- Proceedings of the Xth Conference on Nonlinear Oscillations, Varna, Bulgaria (1984).
- Proceedings 28th Midwest Symposium on Circuits and Systems, Louisville, Kentucky, USA (1985) with N.D. Birjuk.
- Proceedings 26th Midwest Symposium on Circuits and Systems, Puebla, Mexico (1986) with N. D. Birjuk.
- Proceedings XIth Int. Conference on Nonlinear Oscillations, Janos Bolyai Mathematical Society, Budapest (1987)
- MTA Sz TAKI Proceedings, Computer and Automation Institute, Hungarian Academy of Sciences, 1988
- Proceedings 1989 SBMO Int. Microwave Symposium, São Paulo, Brasil (1989).
- Proceedings of Xth Intern. Conference on Noise in Physical Systems, Hungarian Academy of Sciences, Budapest (1990).
- Proceedings University of Bergamo, Bergamo, Italy (2002,) (2003) with E. Spedicato.

=== Articles in Russian ===
Partial list:

- Vestnik of Moscow State University, series Physics-Astronomy, Moscow, (1977).
- Izvestiya VUZ. Radioelektronika, Kazan, USSR, (1983), (1985), (1987).
- Radiotekhnika i Elektronika, Nauka Publ., Moscow, (1984), (1985), (1988).
- Journal of Technical Physics, Warsaw, (1985).
- Radiotechnika, Popov's Russian Technological Society, Moscow, (1985), (1987), (1990), (1993).
- Elektrichestvo, RAN Publ., Moscow, (1988), (1991).
- Elektrotechnika i Elektronika, Sofia, Bulgaria (1985), (1991).
- Comptes-Rendus de l'Académie Bulgare des Sciences, Sofia, (1986), (1986), (1986), (1987), (1987), (1990), (1991), (1991).
- Ukrainian Journal of Physics, Kiev, (1993), (1997).
- In Bulgarian' (partial list):
- Bulgarian Journal of Physics, (1977), (1978), (1979).
- Elektropromishlenost i Priproborostroene, (1980), (1981), (1989).
- Comptes-Rendus de l'Académie Bulgare des Sciences, Sofia, (1983), (1984), (1985), (1987), (1990), (1990), (1991), (1991), (1991), (1991), (1992), (1993), (1993), (1995), (1996), (1999).
- Technical Ideas, (1995), (2002).
- Proceedings 2nd Intern. Conference on Electronic Circuits ICKC, Prague, Czekhoslovakia, (1979).
