= Van Zandt Williams =

American physicist

- Born: 1916
- Died: 1966 (aged 49–50)
- Scientific career
- Fields: Physics

Van Zandt Williams (1916–1966) was president of the Optical Society of America in 1966. He was the Director of the American Institute of Physics in 1965.

== See also ==
- List of OSA presidents
