= Vladimir Babeshko =

Russian physicist

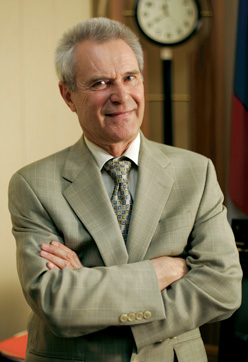
Vladimir A. Babeshko - former president of Kuban State University

Vladimir A. Babeshko (born 30 May 1941; Russian: Владимир Андреевич Бабешко) is a Russian physicist and the former President of Kuban State University in Krasnodar, Russia.

== Directions of activity ==
In 1982, Vladimir Babeshko was elected President of Kuban State University. Having found support among the workers of the university, Babeshko started implementing the idea of improving educational process based on the priority development of science. Under his leadership Kuban State University became one of the leading institutions of higher education in Russia. In 2002, the Russian-Swiss Business Club awarded a gold medal for outstanding business reputation to Kuban State University.

Babeshko is a member of the Presidium of the Russian Academy of Sciences, Russian Higher Certification Board, American Acoustical Society, Vice-President of the Russian Rectors' Union and "Znanie" International Organization.

Babeshko has a Doctor of Sciences (physics and mathematics), Professor, Full Member of the Russian Academy of Science. He is one of the scientists who discovered the existence of high frequency resonance in semi-restricted media with inhomogeneities.

== Scientific interests ==
V.A. Babeshko is a specialist in the field of mechanics of a deformable solid body, applied mathematics, integral and differentiated equations, geophysics, acoustics, seismology, ecology. He is one of the authors who discovered a new physical phenomenon: the existence of high-frequency resonance in semi-bounded environments with heterogeneities. The main results of studies of this phenomenon are widely used in aviation, engineering, seismology and ecology. These methods are indispensable in assessing the strength of engineering structures and structures. V. A. Babeshko directs research on the seismic safety of cities that are located at the junction of geophysics and mechanics and are made with the support of scientists from other countries, in particular from the United States.

== Awards ==
Babeshko has received the Laureate of the State Award of the Russian Federation, Laureate of the Lenin Komsomol Award, Vice-President of the Russian Union of Rectors, and is a member of the Russian Higher Attestation Committee and the Acoustical Society of America. He is an honoured Scientist of Russia, Kuban and the Republic of Adygea. Awarded the "Sign of Honour" Order and the Order of People’s Friendship, the Vavilov medal and the medal of Kuban Hero of Labour, an honorary breastplate "Rector of the Year" (2004, 2005). In January 2006, Babeshko was elected Honorary Senator of the Berlin University of Applied Sciences, which once again demonstrated the international recognition of the university.

== Publications ==
Over 300 research works published, including five monographs.
