= Valentin Scheidel =

German physicist

Valentin Scheidel (born 1883) was a German physicist.

Scheidel received his doctorate from the Ludwig-Maximilians-Universität München in 1911, under Arnold Sommerfeld.
