= Virgin neutron =

Neutron that has not collided with anything

A virgin neutron is a neutron which has originated from any source but has not yet collided with anything.
