= Viscimation =

Viscimation is the turbulence when liquids of different viscosities mix, particularly the formation of vortices (also known as "viscimetric whorls") and visible separate threads of the different liquids.

The term viscimation is archaic and idiosyncratic to whisky tasting; their study (or appreciation) is called viscimetry, and the capacity of a whisky to sustain viscimation (which is predominantly its alcohol percentage) is viscimetric potential or viscimetric index.

Causing viscometric whorls by adding water to liquor is colloquially called "awakening the serpent".
