= Vladimir Krivchenkov =

Vladimir Dmitrievich Krivchenkov (Russian: Владимир Дмитриевич Кривченков; 15 October 1917 – 7 October 1997) was a Russian physicist, author and the creator of the "Deterministic concept of Quantum Mechanics". Krivchenkov also worked as a professor at the Physics Department of the Moscow State University.

== Life ==
Krivchenkov was born on 15 October 1917 to Dmitrii Krivchenkov and Maria Kalugina in Podolsk, Moscow Governorate. He entered the physics department of Moscow State University in 1935 and graduated as a Physicist in 1941. He worked at the Physical Military Institute on the destruction of magnetic mines from 1942 to 1944, then at the Physics department of MSU as assistant professor and later professor from 1944 to 2000.

== Interpretation of Quantum mechanics ==
According to Krivchenkov, the intents to "interpret" quantum mechanics in terms of classical mechanics have no more sense than interpretation of heliocentric cosmological system in terms of geocentric system. Only the old tradition forced the physicists to discuss the so-called Copenhagen interpretation of quantum mechanics. Quantum mechanics is completely deterministic systems, where any event always has a cause and any cause always has an effect. However, some quantum mechanical systems are complicated, so we have to describe them classically (quasi-classically, semi-classically, pseudo-classically, ...). Then, immediately, probability appears, because classical mechanics cannot interpret events in a deterministic way. An intermediate step is provided by the formalism of the density matrix, that allows us to keep some quantum mechanical properties in the classical description; however, such a description is not complete and it is just a compromise between the deterministic description of too complicated a system and wishes to make any (at least probabilistic) predictions.

As an example of the superiority of quantum mechanics, Krivchenkov usually cited the 3-body problem. The 2-body Kepler problem has an analytic ("exact") solution, which is periodic. The quantum-mechanical analogy corresponds to the Hydrogen atom, which also has an analytic ("exact") solution in closed form, described with the Coulomb wave function. The addition of a third particle Helium atom still admits analytic estimates that can be performed by a 3rd-grade student. However, the classical analogy becomes so complicated that it is not even included in a university course of astronomy.

In such a way, it is classical mechanics that could in some sense be interpreted in terms of quantum mechanics (the correspondence principle). By itself, quantum mechanics is a self-consistent deterministic theory that does not need any interpretation.

== Perturbation theory ==
Quantum field theory is a generalization of quantum mechanics. Krivchenkov believed that people need to understand at least the non–relativistic theory. He almost asked students to excuse him for the field theory, where only perturbation theory can be offered. Not only do the perturbation theory series diverge, but each perturbational term also in some sense is infinite, and a special renormalization of the interaction constant is required to give the result the physical sense.

One of the colleagues of Krivchenkov, Yurii Shirokov tried to construct quantum field theory in terms of wave packets, without divergences, using the algebra of generalized functions, but even now this approach is not sufficiently developed. Krivchenkov told students that they are supposed to build up a "true" theory, not just a perturbation, that always gives a divergent series. This statement (dogma) applies not only to Field Theory and quantum mechanics, but to any perturbation theory with respect to any distributed system; the perturbation series always diverges. Krivchenkov had realized this and brought this knowledge to students. Many problems in his books stress this property of perturbation theory.
