= Boris Derjaguin =

Russian chemist (1902–1994)

- Born: Boris Vladimirovich Derjaguin; 9 August 1902; Moscow, Russian Empire
- Died: 16 May 1994 (aged 91); Moscow, Russian Federation
- Known for: Derjaguin approximation Derjaguin number DLVO theory DMT model Diffusiophoresis; Disjoining pressure Polywater
- Awards: USSR State Prize (1990)
- Scientific career
- Fields: Biophysics; Physical chemistry

Boris Vladimirovich Derjaguin (or Deryagin; Russian: Бори́с Влади́мирович Деря́гин) (9 August 1902 in Moscow – 16 May 1994) was a Soviet and Russian chemist. He laid the foundation of the modern interface and colloid science. He was elected to the Russian Academy of Sciences,

Derjaguin became famous in scientific circles for his work on the stability of colloids and thin films of liquids which is now known as the DLVO theory, after the initials of its authors: Derjaguin, Lev Landau, Evert Verwey, and Theodoor Overbeek. It is universally included in text books on colloid chemistry and is still widely applied in modern studies of interparticle forces in colloids. In particular, the Derjaguin approximation is widely used in order to approximate the interaction between curved surfaces from a knowledge of the interaction for planar ones.

Derjaguin was also briefly involved in polywater research during the 1960s and early 1970s. This field claimed that if water was heated then cooled in quartz capillaries, it took on astonishing new properties. Eventually, the scientists who were involved in polywater admitted it did not exist, claiming they were misled by poorly designed experiments (Derjaguin rejected polywater in 1973).

He is also known for having hotly rejected some of the then-new ideas of adhesion as presented by the Western bloc in the 1970s. His model came to be known as the DMT model (after Derjaguin, Vladimir M. Muller and Yu P. Toporov), while the model presented by Western bloc scientists came to be known as the JKR model (after Kenneth L. Johnson, Kevin Kendall and Alan D. Roberts) for adhesive elastic contact. This rejection proved to be instrumental in the development of the David Tabor and later Daniel Maugis parameters that quantify which contact model (of the JKR and DMT models) represent adhesive contact better for specific materials.

In 1935, Derjaguin founded the Laboratory of Thin Layers at the Institute of Physical Chemistry of the Academy of Sciences of the Soviet Union in Moscow. He was the head of the laboratory until 1988, when the age limit for directors of research divisions was introduced. He was replaced by Vladimir Muller as the head of the laboratory.

== Selected works ==
=== From 1980 onwards ===
- Derjaguin, B. V. (1980). "Analytical calculation of repulsion forces arising when the non-ionic diffuse adsorption layers are overlapped". Colloid and Polymer Science. 258 (4): 433–438. doi:10.1007/BF01480837.
- —— (1980). "Structural and thermodynamic peculiarities of the boundary layers of liquids". Pure and Applied Chemistry. 52 (5): 1163–1178. Bibcode:1980PApCh..52.1163D. doi:10.1351/pac198052051163.
- —— (1982). "Certain results obtained in research on long-range surface forces". Russian Chemical Bulletin. 31 (8): 1528–1532. doi:10.1007/BF00956886. S2CID 95538345.
- —— (1987). "Modern state of the investigation of long-range surface forces". Langmuir. 3 (5): 601–606. doi:10.1021/la00077a001.
- —— (1987). "Some results from 50 years' research on surface forces". Surface Forces and Surfactant Systems. Progress in Colloid & Polymer Science. Vol. 74. Steinkopff Verlag. pp. 17–30. doi:10.1007/BFb0109369. ISBN 978-3-7985-0745-6.
- —— (1988). "Mechanical properties of the boundary lubrication layer". Wear. 128 (1): 19–27. doi:10.1016/0043-1648(88)90250-5.
- —— (1989). "The influence of surface forces on the formation of structural peculiarities in the boundary layers of liquids and boundary phases". Colloids and Surfaces. 38 (1): 49–60. doi:10.1016/0166-6622(89)80142-8. S2CID 95738552.
- —— (1989). Theory of Stability of Colloids and Thin Films. Plenum Press. ISBN 978-0-306-11022-1. OCLC 18959853. OL 10322147M.
- —— (1992). "On the question of development of the thermodynamics of the systems with thin (non-gibbsian) interlayers: Methods for determination of the thermodynamic thickness of thin interlayers". Advances in Colloid and Interface Science. 40: 191–200. doi:10.1016/0001-8686(92)80076-A.
- —— (1992). "Summary of development of the theory of stability of colloids and thin films". Russian Chemical Bulletin. 41 (8): 1321–1328. doi:10.1007/BF00864326. S2CID 98301174.
- —— (1993). "Amendment of Archimedes' principle". Colloids and Surfaces A: Physicochemical and Engineering Aspects. 81: 289–290. doi:10.1016/0927-7757(93)80257-F.
- Derjaguin, B. V. (1993). "The world of neglected thicknesses and its place and role in nature and technology". Colloids and Surfaces A: Physicochemical and Engineering Aspects. 79 (1): 1–9. doi:10.1016/0927-7757(93)80154-7.

=== Reprints ===
- "Selected works of B. V. Derjaguin. Vol. 1. Surface forces in thin films and disperse systems". Progress in Surface Science. 40 (1–4). 1992. OCLC 311711602. OL 20699418M.
- "Selected works of B. V. Derjaguin. Vol. 2. Dynamics of disperse systems". Progress in Surface Science. 43 (1–4). 1993. OCLC 312119628. OL 19430223M.
- "Selected works of B. V. Derjaguin. Vol. 3. Formation and growth of the new phase and new surfaces". Progress in Surface Science. 45 (1–4). 1994. OCLC 311883926. OL 20767173M.

== See also ==
- Lifshitz theory of van der Waals force
