= Emmie Lucassen-Reynders =

Dutch chemist (1935–2023)

Emmie Helena Lucassen-Reynders
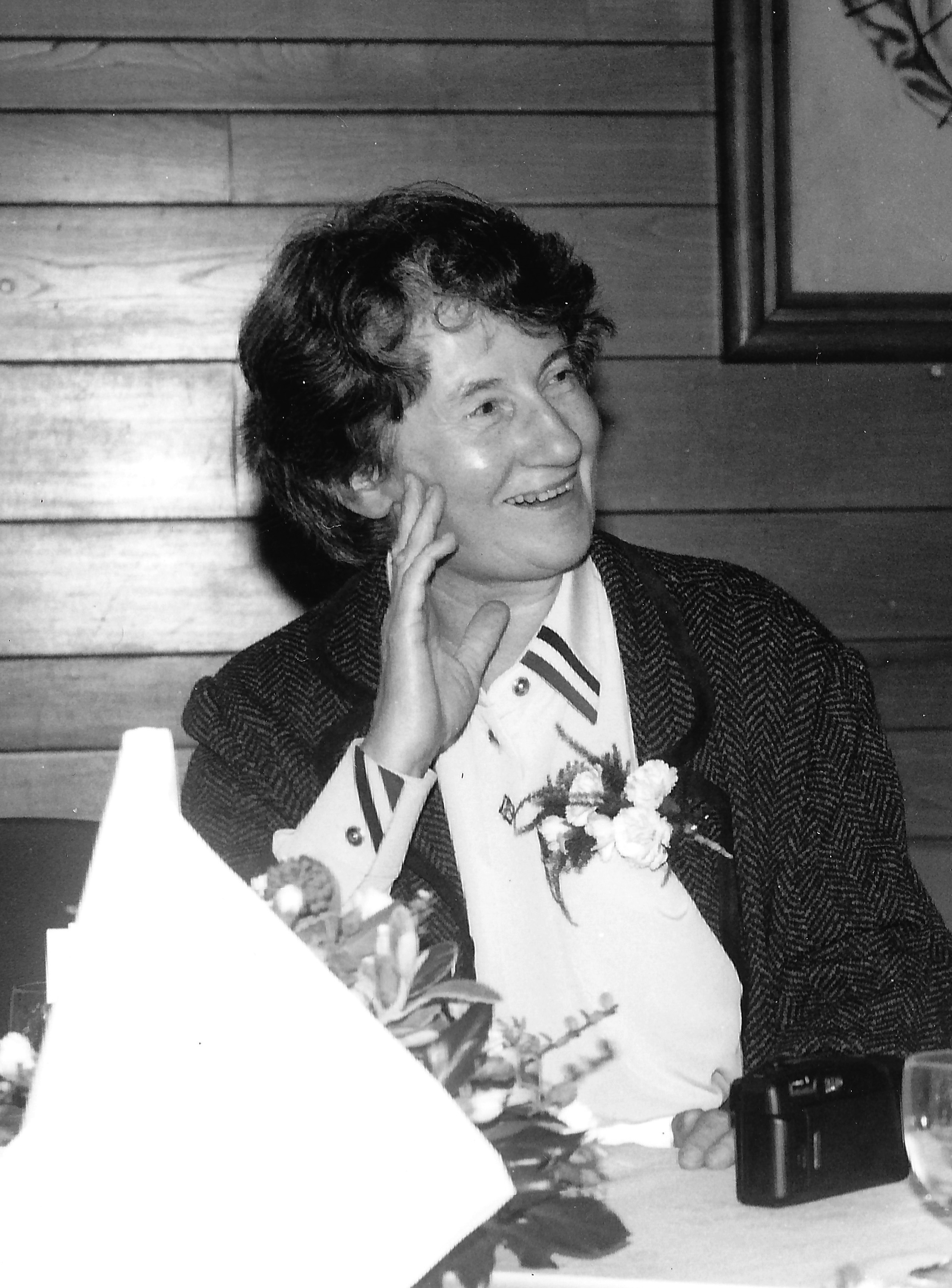
- Born: Emmie Reynders; 25 February 1935; Vught, Netherlands
- Died: 27 January 2023 (aged 87)
- Education: Utrecht University
- Scientific career
- Workplaces: Unilever
- Thesis: Stabilization of water in oil emulsions by solid particles (1962)

Emmie Helena Lucassen-Reynders, last name Reijnders in Dutch spelling, (25 February 1935 – 27 January 2023) was a Dutch scientist specialising in colloid chemistry and theoretical physics. She worked in both academia and in industry.

== Early life and education ==
Lucassen-Reynders was born in Vught. Her parents were both teachers who met in Zaandam during World War I. Lucassen-Reynders attended the municipal gymnasium in 's-Hertogenbosch and started her study of chemistry at Utrecht University in 1952. She graduated in 1959, specialising in Colloid Chemistry and Theoretical Physics at the Van't Hoff laboratory. At the same laboratory she met her future husband Jaap Lucassen in 1958. After earning her degree, she moved to Unilever in Vlaardingen, where she joined the Physical Chemistry group led by Max van den Tempel. Recognising her talents, Van den Tempel encouraged her to work towards a PhD, and in 1962 Lucassen-Reynders defended her dissertation on ‘Stabilization of water in oil emulsions by solid particles’ at Utrecht University in front of Theodoor Overbeek

== Research and career ==
Lucassen-Reynders' early research considered the impact of fat crystals on the stability of water in emulsions with oils. Based on the Pickering mechanism, the fat crystals would stabilize this emulsion, in which solid particles are wetted by the continuous phase. If the emission is water-continuous, the Pickering mechanisms require the solid particles to be polar (for example barium sulfate), whilst in oil-continuous emulsions, the particles must be apolar. The contact angle is approximately constant and independent of the concentration of particles and type of surfactant. Lucassen-Reynders used Young's equation and Gibbs' law to explain the relationship between the interfacial tensions and adsorptions of the solid, oil and water. She continued to investigate the surface equation of state for solutions with surfactants, considering both ionic and non-ionic surfactants. The consideration of ionic surfactants introduced compilation due to their surface electric potentials, which didn't match the neutral requirements of Gibbs' adsorption law.

In 1964, Lucassen-Reynders spent a year in the United States, where she derived the relationship between surfactant concentration, surface tension and adsorption with ionised surfactants and non-surface-active electrolytes. She showed that the behaviour of ionised surfactants in oil and water emulsions could be predicted from the behaviour of single components and used the concept of surface electroneutrality to understand how mixing anionic and cationic surfactants impacted adsorption and surface pressure.

In 1969, Lucassen-Reynders moved to England, where she researched surface elasticity and viscosity. She studied food emulsions, with a focus on interfacial viscoelasticity and emulsification. She moved back to the Netherlands in 1986 and continued her research in the Physical Chemistry group at Unilever Research in Vlaardingen until her retirement in 1997. Lucassen-Reynders remained active after her retirement, supervising PhD students and continuing to publish. Much of Lucassen-Reynders’ life work was recognised in an Honorary Note in the leading journal of her field.

== Personal life and death ==
Lucassen-Reynders was married to Jaap Lucassen, who she met at the University of Utrecht. Also a physical scientist, Lucassen’s work, including many collaborations with Lucassen-Reynders, is well recognised in an Honorary Note [Advances in Colloid and Interface Science 107 (2004) 1–7 ] and in his obituary. Together they had two daughters.

Lucassen-Reynders died on 27 January 2023, at the age of 87.

== Selected publications ==
- V.B Fainerman; E.H Lucassen-Reynders; R Miller (December 1998). "Adsorption of surfactants and proteins at fluid interfaces". Colloids and Surfaces. 143 (2–3): 141–165. doi:10.1016/s0927-7757(98)00585-8. ISSN 0927-7757. Wikidata Q58893945.
- Fainerman VB; Lucassen-Reynders EH; Reinhard Miller (1 December 2003). "Description of the adsorption behaviour of proteins at water/fluid interfaces in the framework of a two-dimensional solution model". Advances in Colloid and Interface Science. 106: 237–259. doi:10.1016/s0001-8686(03)00112-x. ISSN 0001-8686. PMID 14672849. Wikidata Q52410994.
- Benjamins, J.; Cagna, A.; Lucassen-Reynders, E.H. (1996). "Viscoelastic properties of triacylglycerol/water interfaces covered by proteins". Colloids and Surfaces A: Physicochemical and Engineering Aspects. 114: 245–254. doi:10.1016/0927-7757(96)03533-9. ISSN 0927-7757.
- Anionic surfactants: Physical chemistry of surfactant action Lucassen-Reynders, E. H. ISBN 0824710177, 9780824710170 Publisher:M. Dekker, 1981
- Lucassen-Reynders EH, van den Tempel M. Stabilization of water in oil emulsions by solid particles. J Phys Chem 1963;67:731.
- Lucassen-Reynders EH. Contact angles and adsorption on solids. J Phys Chem 1963;67:969.
- Lucassen-Reynders EH, van den Tempel M. Surface equation of state for adsorbed surfactants. Proceedings IVth International Congress on Surface Active Substances, Brussels; 1964.
- Lucassen-Reynders EH. Surface equation of state for ionized surfactants. J Phys Chem 1966;70:1777.
- Lucassen-Reynders EH. & Lucassen, J. 1969 Properties of capillary waves. Adv. Colloid Interface Sci. 2, 347–395.
- Lucassen-Reynders EH. A surface equation of state for mixed surfactant monolayers. J Colloid Interface Sci 1972;41:156.
- Lucassen-Reynders EH. Surface properties of mixed anionic/cationic surfactant solutions. Kolloid-Z Z Polym 1972;250:356.
- Lucassen-Reynders EH, Lucassen J, Giles D. Surface and bulk properties of mixed

anionic/cationic surfactant systems, I. Equilibrium surface properties. J Colloid Interface Sci 1981;81:150.

- Fainerman VB, Lucassen-Reynders EH. Adsorption of single and mixed ionic

surfactants at fluid interfaces. Adv Colloid Interface Sci 2002;96:295.

- van den Tempel M, Lucassen-Reynders EH. Relaxation processes at fluid interfaces. Adv Colloid Interface Sci 1983;18:281.
- Lucassen-Reynders EH. Dynamic interfacial properties in emulsification. In:

Becher P, editor. Encyclopedia of Emulsion Technology, vol. 4. New York: Dekker; 1996.

- Lucassen-Reynders EH. Competitive adsorption of emulsifiers, 1. Theory for

adsorption of small and large molecules. Colloids Surf, A 1994;91:79.

- Benjamins J, Lucassen-Reynders EH. Surface dilational rheology of proteins adsorbed at air/water and oil/water interfaces. In: Möbius D, Miller R, editors.

Proteins at Liquid Interfaces. Amsterdam: Elsevier Science B.V.; 1998. p. 341.

- Lucassen-Reynders EH, Benjamins J. Dilational rheology of proteins adsorbed at fluid interfaces. Current Opinion in Colloid & Interface Science Volume 15, Issue 4, August 2010, Pages 264-270.
- Fainerman VB, Lucassen-Reynders EH, Miller R. Description of the adsorption

behaviour of proteins at water/fluid interfaces in the framework of a two- dimensional solution model. Adv Colloid Interface Sci 2003;106:237.

- Lucassen-Reynders EH, Fainerman VB, Miller R. Surface dilational modulus or gibbs' elasticity of protein adsorption layers J Phys Chem B 2004;108:9173.
