= Norbert Willenbacher =

- Education: Johannes Gutenberg University Mainz
- Known for: Research on the rheology, structure and processing of complex fluids and functional materials
- Scientific career
- Fields: Rheology; Process engineering Materials science
- Workplaces: Karlsruhe Institute of Technology

Norbert Willenbacher is a German physicist. He is the professor of mechanical process engineering at the Karlsruhe Institute of Technology. He is known for discovering the capillary suspension phenomenon. He is the former President of the German Rheological Society.

== Career ==
Willenbacher studied physics at Johannes Gutenberg University Mainz and completed his dissertation at the Max Planck Institute for Polymer Research in 1990. Following his doctorate, he joined BASF SE's polymer research division. His work centered on the rheology, formulation and processing of complex fluids.

In 2005, he became Head of the Institute of Mechanical Process Engineering and Mechanics at Karlsruhe Institute of Technology. From 2012 to 2014, he was the Dean of the Faculty for Chemical and Process Engineering at KIT. Since 2017, Willenbacher also serves as Head of the Technology Transfer Unit "Rheology and Formulation of Complex Fluids" at KIT Campus Transfer GmbH.

Willenbacher has been a visiting professor at Harvard University (2015), Seoul National University (2016), and Donghua University in Shanghai (2024). He held teaching assignments at institutions including the CASIC Research Institute for New Materials in Changsha, Wuyi University, the University of Pisa, and the Technical University of Łódź.

Willenbacher served as President of the German Rheological Society (DRG) from 2006 to 2019 and as Vice President until 2022. He then joined the society's advisory board. He was a section editor of Current Opinion in Colloid and Interface Science from 2011 to 2016. He also served on the editorial boards of Rheologica Acta from 2010 to 2024 and Materials from 2020 onward.

From 2006 to 2014, he was a member of the supervisory board of juwi AG, serving as its chairman from 2013 to 2014.

Willenbacher served on the city council of Kirchheimbolanden from 1999 to 2014 and as a member of the Donnersbergkreis district council from 2004 to 2009. Since 2013, he has served as a spokesperson for the Kirchheimbolanden Peace Days (Kirchheimbolander Friedenstage).

== Research ==
Willenbacher's research focuses on correlations between molecular properties, microstructure, colloidal interactions, and macroscopic flow to guide rational product development.

Willenbacher has studied a range of materials - from dilute solutions to multiphase fluids including coatings, adhesives, foods, biopolymer gels, ceramics, battery slurries, and even artist paints. He has worked on understanding the role of complex-fluid rheology in techniques such as spraying, slot-die and blade coating, fine-line screen printing, and extrusion-based additive manufacturing.

His research group developed micro-rheo-mapping (MRM), an imaging-based method for measuring local rheological properties and studying structural variations in gels.

Willenbacher's group discovered the capillary suspension phenomenon. In a three-phase system consisting of a bulk liquid, particles, and a small amount of a second immiscible liquid, capillary forces induced by the secondary fluid can create a particle network spanning the entire sample volume. This network alters the rheological properties, converting a fluid-like suspension into a gel-like paste with a tunable yield stress. The capillary suspension has practical applications and is used to control the texture of food, the processing and structure of porous ceramic materials, or the conductivity of polymer composites including conductive fillers. The application-oriented focus of Willenbacher’s research has led to the founding of two startup companies: FastCast Ceramics GmbH and Karlsruhe Conductive Materials GmbH.

Currently, Willenbacher's research addresses the rheological challenges in energy materials processing. This includes the development of silver pastes for metallization of solar cells as well as the investigation of lithium-ion battery electrode slurries, focusing on the effect of polymeric binders on processing stability and cell performance. Willenbacher’s group develops conductive, 3D-printable inks and filaments for elastomer composites used in soft electronic applications.

== Awards and honors ==
- NEULAND Innovation Award, Karlsruhe Institute of Technology (KIT)
- Neo2023 Innovation Award, Technology Area Karlsruhe
- Publication Award, Rheologica Acta (2017)
- Publication Award, Journal of Rheology (2024)

== Selected publications ==
- Fritz, G.; Schädler, V.; Willenbacher, N.; Wagner, N. J. (2002). "Electrosteric stabilization of colloidal dispersions". Langmuir. 18 (16): 6381–6390. doi:10.1021/la015734j.
- Koos, E.; Willenbacher, N. (2011). "Capillary forces in suspension rheology". Science. 331 (6019): 897–900. doi:10.1126/science.1199243.
- Maurath, J.; Willenbacher, N. (2017). "3D printing of open-porous cellular ceramics with high specific strength". Journal of the European Ceramic Society. 37 (15): 4833–4842. doi:10.1016/j.jeurceramsoc.2017.06.001.
- Abdel Aal, K.; Willenbacher, Norbert (2020). "Front side metallization of silicon solar cells – A high-speed video imaging analysis of the screen printing process". Solar Energy Materials and Solar Cells. 217 110721. doi:10.1016/j.solmat.2020.110721.
- Wang, Y.; Willenbacher, N. (2022). "Phase-Change-Enabled, Rapid, High-Resolution Direct Ink Writing of Soft Silicone". Advanced Materials. 34 (15) 2109240. doi:10.1002/adma.202109240.
- Oelschlaeger, C.; Marten, J.; Péridont, F.; Willenbacher, N. (2022). "Imaging of the microstructure of Carbopol dispersions and correlation with their macroelasticity: a micro-and macrorheological study". Journal of Rheology. 66 (4): 749–760. doi:10.1122/8.0000452.
- Menne, D.; Hübner, C.; Trebbels, D.; Willenbacher, N. (2022). "Robust soil water potential sensor to optimize irrigation in agriculture". Sensors. 22 (12): 4465. doi:10.3390/s22124465. PMC 9227105.
- Ranquet, O.; Duce, C.; Bramanti, E.; Dietemann, P.; Bonaduce, I.; Willenbacher, N. (2023). "A holistic view on the role of egg yolk in Old Masters' oil paints". Nature Communications. 14 (1): 1534. doi:10.1038/s41467-023-36859-5. hdl:11568/1174706.
