= Journal of Colloid and Interface Science =

- Discipline: Colloid and interface science
- Language: English
- Edited by: M. Malmsten

Publication details
- Former name: Journal of Colloid Science
- History: 1946–present
- Publisher: Elsevier
- Frequency: Biweekly
- Impact factor: 9.6 (2025)

Standard abbreviations
- ISO 4: J. Colloid Interface Sci.

Indexing
- CODEN: JCISA5
- ISSN: 0021-9797 (print); 1095-7103 (web)
- LCCN: 74644184
- OCLC no.: 36935837

Links
- Journal homepage; Online access; Archive of Journal of Colloid Science

The Journal of Colloid and Interface Science is a peer-reviewed scientific journal published by Elsevier. It covers research related to colloid and interface science with a particular focus on colloidal materials and nanomaterials; surfactants and soft matter; adsorption, catalysis and electrochemistry; interfacial processes, capillarity and wetting; biomaterials and nanomedicine; and novel phenomena and techniques. The editor-in-chief is Martin Malmsten (Uppsala University). The journal was established in 1946 as Journal of Colloid Science. It obtained its current name in 1966.

== Abstracting and indexing ==
The journal is abstracted and indexed in:

- AGRICOLA
- Biological Abstracts
- Chemical Abstracts
- Chemical Engineering Abstracts
- Chemistry Citation Index
- Current Contents/Physics, Chemical, & Earth Sciences
- EMBASE
- Science Citation Index
- Scopus

According to the Journal Citation Reports, the journal has a 2021 Impact Factor of 9.965, ranking it 32nd out of 162 journals in the category "Chemistry, Physical".

== See also ==
- Colloids and Surfaces A: Physicochemical and Engineering Aspects
- Colloids and Surfaces B: Biointerfaces
- Advances in Colloid and Interface Science
- Current Opinion in Colloid & Interface Science
- Progress in Polymer Science
