= Jean-Louis Salager =

Person born in Montpellier, France, on May 22, 1944

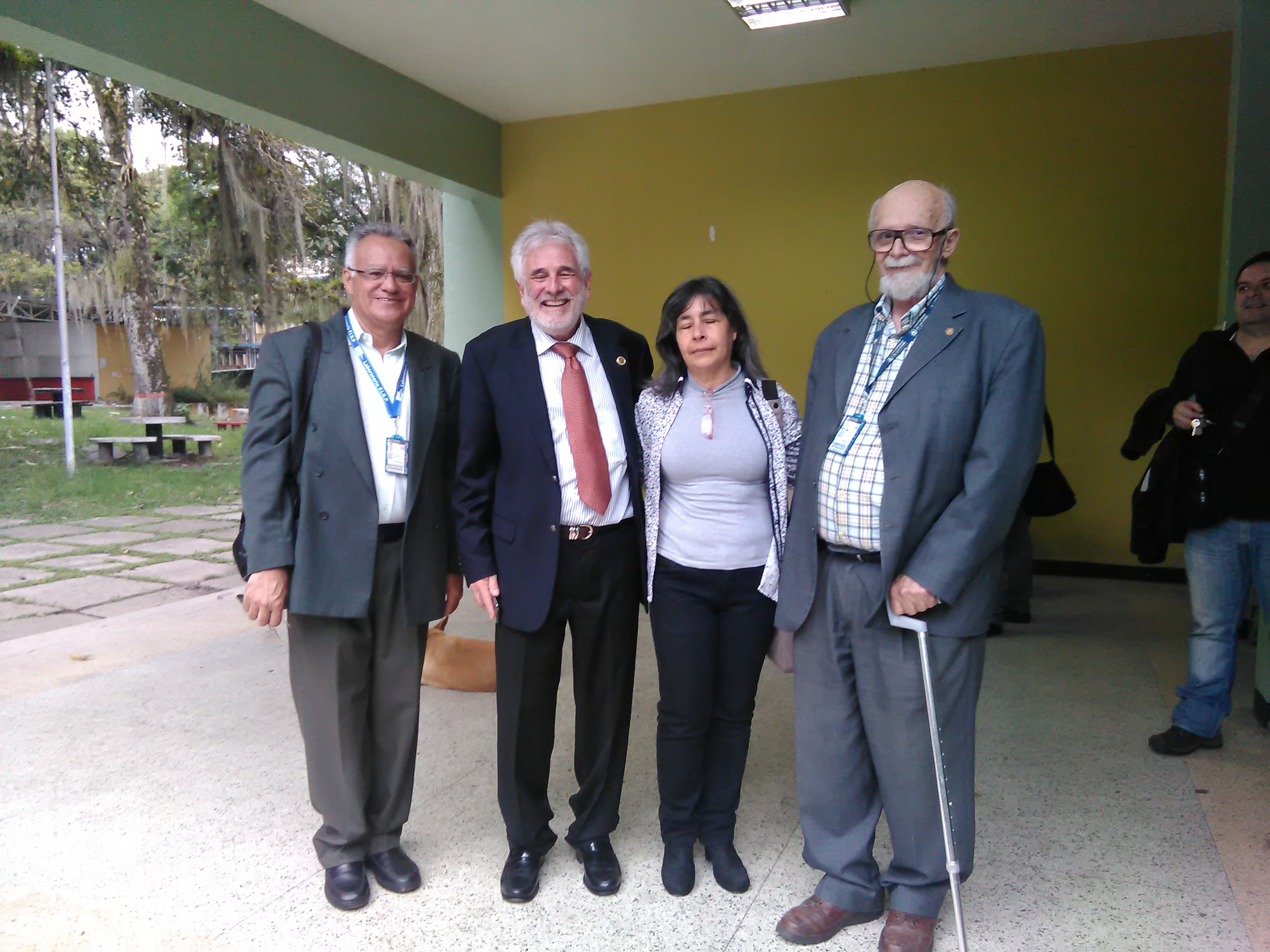
- Professor Jean-Louis Salager (right)
- Born: May 22, 1944 (age 82); Montpellier, France
- Education: University of Nancy; University of Texas at Austin
- Scientific career
- Fields: Chemical engineering, surfactants, emulsions
- Workplaces: University of the Andes

Jean-Louis Salager was born in Montpellier, France, on May 22, 1944. He obtained the titles of BSc. in chemistry (1966) and chemical engineering (1967) at the University of Nancy (France), MSc. in chemical engineering (1970) and PhD in chemical engineering (1975) at the University of Texas (United States) and postdoctorate at the University of Texas (1977–1978). Admitted as assistant professor at the School of Chemical Engineering Universidad de Los Andes, Mérida, Venezuela (1970), where he recently obtained the professor emeritus category. He has supervised over 100 undergraduate and 60 MSc & Dr/PhD dissertations. He has written 20 book chapters and more than 600 articles and communications. He is the second most cited researcher in Venezuelan institutions, according to the Google Scholar Scitations ranking published in 2015.

== Scientific work ==
His research areas include: interfacial phenomena and surfactants, phase behavior and physico-chemical formulation of surfactant-oil/water systems, micro/macroemulsions, phase inversion, foams, and surface rheology of ultralow tension surfactant-oil-water systems. Responsible of research, development and service contracts in Enhanced oil recovery, dehydration, emulsified transport, drilling muds, formulation of emulsions, foams and dispersions, among other applications, and oil application projects. (Orimulsion, drilling fluids, improved ASP recovery, dehydration, asphalt emulsions).

Salager was founder of the School of Chemical Engineering at the Universidad de Los Andes, Mérida-Venezuela (1970), commissioned in the period 1970–1975 for the preparation of the curriculum and its approval before the CNU, the hiring of the first teachers, and the design of teaching laboratories. He assumed the direction of the School until the graduation of the first class of students. In 1974 he prepared the first draft of the Master's project in Chemical Engineering and in 1980 he participated in the commission in charge of founding this postgraduate course.

He was also founder of the Laboratory initially known has Laboratory of Interfacial Phenomena and Oil Recovery (1978) and now Formulation Interfaces Rheology and Processes (FIRP) Laboratory.

Salager has been a professor for a great variety of undergraduate, postgraduate, and extension level courses, and has supervised more than 100 undergraduate and 60 master's and doctoral theses. He is also the author of 20 book chapters and more than 600 papers and communications in the areas of formulation of surfactant-water-oil systems, micro / macroemulsions, phase inversion, foams. He also has written more than 40 "FIRP booklets" free modules for education of interfacial phenomena. Responsible for 50 R & D projects with the industrial sector and 40 of CDCHT and CONICIT. Among the distinctions he has received can be mentioned. PPI 4. National Science Award – technological research mention 1997, Simon Bolivar Award 1997, Member of the Latin American Academy of Sciences. In 2015 and 2019 received the award for the best technical paper published in 2014 and 2018, respectively, by the American Cleaning Institute.

He has worked recently (2000–present) in Enhanced Oil Recovery and crude oil dewatering projects, among them seven doctoral theses, the last two funded by Total Petroleum Company. He was awarded in 2020 the Samuel Rosen award prize by the AOCS, being the first academic to receive it due to his extensive work and contributions to the surfactants field in industry.

== Editorial experience ==
He has been for three decades the Latin American editor of the Journal of Dispersion Science and Technology (1985). He has been editor-in-chief of the Journal of Surfactants and Detergents in the AOCS from 2008 to 2014 and is currently its editor-in-chief emeritus. He has been also a member of the editorial board of Current Opinion in Colloid and Interface Science (1996).
