= Bacterial adhesion in aquatic system =

Bacterial adhesion involves the attachment (or deposition) of bacteria on the surface (solid, gel layer, etc.). This interaction plays an important role in natural system as well as in environmental engineering. The attachment of biomass on the membrane surface will result in membrane fouling, which can significantly reduce the efficiency of the treatment system using membrane filtration process in wastewater treatment plants. The low adhesion of bacteria to soil is essential key for the success of in-situ bioremediation in groundwater treatment. However, the contamination of pathogens in drinking water could be linked to the transportation of microorganisms in groundwater and other water sources. Controlling and preventing the adverse impact of the bacterial deposition on the aquatic environment need a deeply understanding about the mechanisms of this process. DLVO theory has been used extensively to describe the deposition of bacteria in many current researches.

== Prediction of bacterial deposition by classical DLVO theory ==
DLVO theory describes the interaction potential between charged surfaces. It is the sum of electrostatic double layer, which can be either attractive of repulsive, and attractive Van der Waals interactions of the charge surfaces. DLVO theory is applied widely in explaining the aggregation and deposition of colloidal and nano particles such as Fullerene C60 in aquatic system. Because bacteria and colloid particles both share the similarities in size and surface charge, the deposition of bacteria also can be describe by the DLVO theory. The prediction is based on sphere-plate interaction for one cell and the surface.

The electrostatic double layer interactions could be described by the expression for the constant surface potential.

$V_{EDL}= \pi \varepsilon_0\varepsilon_ra_p\bigg\{2\psi_p\psi_cln\bigg[\frac{1+exp(-\kappa h)}{1-exp(-\kappa h)}\bigg]+(\psi_p^2+\psi_c^2)ln \big[1-exp(-2 \kappa h)\big] \bigg\}$

Where ε_{0}is the vacuum permittivity, ε_{r} is the relative dielectric permittivity of water, a_{p} is the equivalent spherical radius of the bacteria, κ is the inverse of Debye length, h is the separation distance between the bacterium and the collector surface; ψ_{p} and ψ_{c} are the surface potentials of the bacterial cell and the collector surface. Zeta potential at the surface of the bacteria and the collector were used instead of the surface potential.

The retarded Van der Waals interaction potential was calculated using the expression from Gregory, 1981.

$V_{VdW}=-\frac {Aa_p} {6h} \bigg[ 1+ \frac {14h} {\lambda} \bigg]^{-1}$

With A is Hamaker constant for bacteria-water-surface collector (quartz) = 6.5 × 10^{−21} J and λ is the characteristic wavelength of the dielectric and could be assumed 100 nm, a is the equivalent radius of the bacteria, h is the separation distance from the surface collector to the bacteria.

Thus, the total interaction between bacteria and charged surface can be expressed as follows:

$V_{TOT}= \pi \varepsilon_0\varepsilon_ra_p\bigg\{2\psi_p\psi_cln\bigg[\frac{1+exp(-\kappa h)}{1-exp(-\kappa h)}\bigg]+(\psi_p^2+\psi_c^2)ln \big[1-exp(-2 \kappa h)\big] \bigg\}-\frac {Aa_p} {6h} \bigg[ 1+ \frac {14h} {\lambda} \bigg]^{-1}$

== Current experimental result ==
=== Experimental method ===
Radial stagnant point flow (RSPF) system has currently been used for the experiment of bacterial adhesion with the verification of DLVO theory. It is a well-characterized experimental system and is useful for visualizing the deposition of individual bacteria on the uniform charge, flat quartz surface. The deposition of bacteria on the surface was observed and estimated through an inverted microscope and recorded at regular intervals (10 s or 20 s) with a digital camera.

Many bacterial stains have been used for the experiments. They are:

- Cryptosporidium parvum oocysts, having 3.7 μm equivalent spherical diameter.
- Escherichia coli, having 1.7 μm equivalent spherical diameter.
- Pseudomonas aeruginosa, having 1.24 μm equivalent spherical diameter.

All of the bacterial strains have negative zeta potential at experimental pH (5.5 and 5.8) and less become negative at higher ionic strength in both mono and divalent salt solutions.

Ultra pure quartz surface collectors have been used extensively due to their surface homogeneity, which is an important factor for applying DLVO theory. The quartz surface originally has negative potential. However, the surface of the collectors was usually modified to have positive surface for the favorable deposition experiments.

In some experiments, the surface collector was coated with an alginate layer with negative charge for simulating the real conditioning film in natural system.

=== Result ===
It was concluded that bacterial deposition mainly occurred in a secondary energy minimum by using DLVO theory. DLVO calculation predicted an energy barrier of 140kT at 31.6 mM ionic strength to over 2000kT at 1mM ionic strength. This data was not in agreement with the experimental data, which showed increasing deposition with increasing ionic strength. Therefore, the deposit could occur at secondary minimum having the energy from 0.09kT to 8.1kT at 1mM and 31.6 mM ionic strength, respectively. The conclusion was further proven by the partial release of deposited bacteria when the ionic strength decreased. Because the amount of released bacteria was less than 100%, it was suggested that bacteria could deposit at the primary minimum due to the heterogeneity of the surface collector or bacterial surface. This fact was not covered in classical DLVO theory.

The presence of divalent electrolytes (Ca^{2+}) can neutralize the charge surface of bacteria by the binding between Ca^{2+} and the functional group on the oocyst surface. This resulted in an observable bacterial deposition despite the very high electrostatic repulsive energy from the DLVO prediction.

The motility of bacteria also has a significant effect on the bacterial adhesion. Nonmotile and motile bacteria showed different behavior in deposition experiments. At the same ionic strength, motile bacteria showed greater adhesion to the surface than nonmotile bacteria and motile bacteria can attach to the surface of the collector at high repulsive electrostatic force. It was suggested that the swimming energy of the cells could overcome the repulsive energy or they can adhere to regions of heterogeneity on the surface. The swimming capacity increase with the ionic strength and 100mM is the optimal concentration for the rotation of flagella.

Despite the electrostatic repulsion energy from DLVO calculation between the bacteria and surface collector, the deposition could occur due to other interactions such as the steric impact of the presence of flagella on the cell environment and the strong hydrophobicity of the cell.
