= Depletion force =

Effective force in molecular and colloidal systems

A depletion force is an effective attractive force that arises between large colloidal particles that are suspended in a dilute solution of depletants, which are smaller solutes that are preferentially excluded from the vicinity of the large particles. One of the earliest reports of depletion forces that lead to particle coagulation is that of Bondy, who observed the separation or "creaming" of rubber latex upon addition of polymer depletant molecules (sodium alginate) to solution. More generally, depletants can include polymers, micelles, osmolytes, ink, mud, or paint dispersed in a continuous phase.

Depletion forces are often regarded as entropic forces, as was first explained by the established Asakura–Oosawa model. In this theory the depletion force arises from an increase in osmotic pressure of the surrounding solution when colloidal particles get close enough such that the excluded cosolutes (depletants) cannot fit in between them. Because the particles were considered as hard-core (completely rigid) particles, the emerging picture of the underlying mechanism inducing the force was necessarily entropic.

== Causes ==
=== Sterics ===
The system of colloids and depletants in solution is typically modeled by treating the large colloids and small depletants as dissimilarly sized hard spheres. Hard spheres are characterized as non-interacting and impenetrable spheres. These two fundamental properties of hard spheres are described mathematically by the hard-sphere potential. The hard-sphere potential imposes steric constraint around large spheres which in turn gives rise to excluded volume, that is, volume that is unavailable for small spheres to occupy.

==== Hard-sphere potential ====
In a colloidal dispersion, the colloid-colloid interaction potential is approximated as the interaction potential between two hard spheres. For two hard spheres of diameter of $\sigma$, the interaction potential as a function of interparticle separation is:

$$V(h)=\left\{ \begin{matrix}0 & \mbox{if}\quad h\geq \sigma \\ \infty & \mbox{if}\quad h< \sigma \end{matrix} \right.$$

called the hard-sphere potential where $h$ is the center-to-center distance between the spheres.

If both colloids and depletants are in a dispersion, there is interaction potential between colloidal particles and depletant particles that is described similarly by the hard-sphere potential. Again, approximating the particles to be hard-spheres, the interaction potential between colloids of diameter $D$ and depletant sols of diameter $d$ is:

$$V(h)=\left\{ \begin{matrix}0 & \mbox{if}\quad h\geq \Big( \frac{D+d}{2} \Big)\\ \infty & \mbox{if}\quad h< \Big( \frac{D+d}{2} \Big) \end{matrix} \right.$$

where $h$ is the center-to-center distance between the spheres. Typically, depletant particles are very small compared to the colloids so $d \ll D$

The underlying consequence of the hard-sphere potential is that dispersed colloids cannot penetrate each other and have no mutual attraction or repulsion.

==== Excluded volume ====
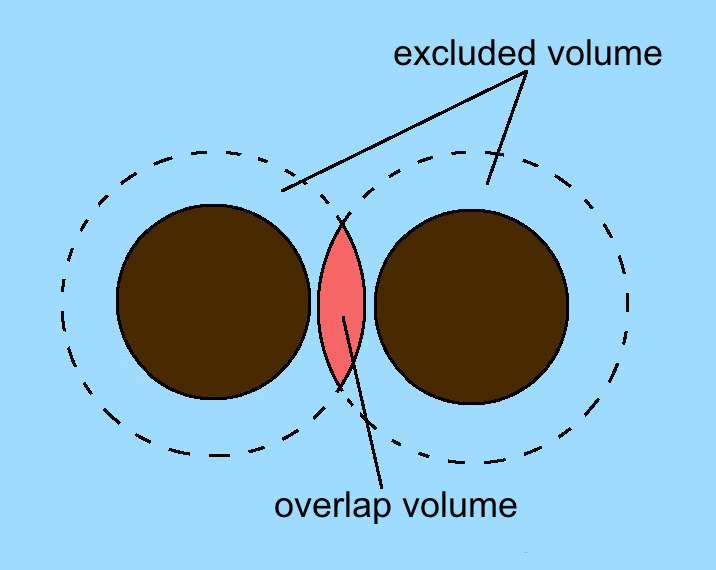
Excluded volumes of hard spheres overlap resulting in an increase in the total volume available to depletants. This increases the entropy of the system and lowers the Helmholtz free energy

When both large colloidal particles and small depletants are in a suspension, there is a region which surrounds every large colloidal particle that is unavailable for the centers of the depletants to occupy. This steric restriction is due to the colloid-depletant hard-sphere potential. The total volume of the excluded region for two spheres is

$$V_\mathrm{E}= \frac{\pi \big(D+d \big)^3}{3}$$

where $D$ is the diameter of the large spheres and $d$ is the diameter of the small spheres.

When the large spheres get close enough, the excluded volumes surrounding the spheres intersect. The overlapping volumes result in a reduced excluded volume, that is, an increase in the total free volume available to small spheres. The reduced excluded volume, $V'_\mathrm{E}$ can be written

$$V'_\mathrm{E}=V_\mathrm{E}- \frac{2 \pi l^2}{3}  \bigg[ \frac{3 \left(D+d \right)}{2} -l \bigg]$$

where $l=(D+d)/2-h/2$ is half the width of the lens-shaped region of overlap volume formed by spherical caps. The volume available $V_\mathrm{A}$ for small spheres is the difference between the total volume of the system and the excluded volume. To determine the available volume for small spheres, there are two distinguishable cases: first, the separation of the large spheres is big enough so small spheres can penetrate in between them; second, the large spheres are close enough so that small spheres cannot penetrate between them. For each case, the available volume for small spheres is given by

$$V_\mathrm{A}=\left\{ \begin{matrix}V-V_\mathrm{E} & \mbox{if}\quad h\geq D+d\\V-V'_\mathrm{E} & \mbox{if}\quad h< D+d \end{matrix} \right.$$

In the latter case small spheres are depleted from the interparticle region between large spheres and a depletion force ensues.

=== Thermodynamics ===
The depletion force is described as an entropic force because it is fundamentally a manifestation of the second law of thermodynamics, which states that a system tends to increase its entropy. The gain in translational entropy of the depletants, owing to the increased available volume, is much greater than the loss of entropy from flocculation of the colloids. The positive change in entropy lowers the Helmholtz free energy and causes colloidal flocculation to happen spontaneously. The system of colloids and depletants in a solution is modeled as a canonical ensemble of hard spheres for statistical determinations of thermodynamic quantities.

However, recent experiments and theoretical models found that depletion forces can be enthalpically driven. In these instances, the intricate balance of interactions between the solution components results in the net exclusion of cosolute from macromolecule. This exclusion results in an effective stabilization of the macromolecule self-association, which can be not only enthalpically dominated, but also entropically unfavorable.

==== Entropy and Helmholtz energy ====
The total volume available for small spheres increases when the excluded volumes around large spheres overlap. The increased volume allotted for small spheres allows them greater translational freedom which increases their entropy. Because the canonical ensemble is an athermal system at a constant volume the Helmholtz free energy is written

$$A=-TS$$

where $A$ is the Helmholtz free energy, $S$ is the entropy and $T$ is the temperature. The system's net gain in entropy is positive from increased volume, thus the Helmholtz free energy is negative and depletion flocculation happens spontaneously.

The free energy of the system is obtained from a statistical definition of Helmholtz free energy

$$A=-k_\mathrm{B}T \ln Q$$

where $Q$ is the partition function for the canonical ensemble. The partition function contains statistical information that describes the canonical ensemble including its total volume, the total number of small spheres, the volume available for small spheres to occupy, and the de Broglie wavelength. If hard-spheres are assumed, the partition function $Q$ is

$$Q= \frac{V_\mathrm{A}^N}{N! \Lambda^{3N}}$$

The volume available for small spheres,$V_\mathrm{A}$ was calculated above.$N$ is the number of small spheres and $\Lambda$ is the de Broglie wavelength. Substituting $Q$ into the statistical definition, the Helmholtz free energy now reads

$$A=-k_\mathrm{B}T\ln \bigg( \frac{V_\mathrm{A}^N}{N! \Lambda^{3N}} \bigg)$$

The magnitude of the depletion force, $\mathcal{F}$ is equal to the change in Helmholtz free energy with distance between two large spheres and is given by

$$\mathcal{F}=- \bigg( \frac{ \partial A}{ \partial h} \bigg)_T$$

The entropic nature of depletion forces was proven experimentally in some cases. For example, some polymeric crowders induce entropic depletion forces that stabilize proteins in their native state. Other examples include many systems with hard-core only interactions.

=== Osmotic pressure ===
The depletion force is an effect of increased osmotic pressure in the surrounding solution. When colloids get sufficiently close, that is when their excluded volumes overlap, depletants are expelled from the interparticle region. This region between colloids then becomes a phase of pure solvent. When this occurs, there is a higher depletant concentration in the surrounding solution than in the interparticle region. The resulting density gradient gives rise to an osmotic pressure that is anisotropic in nature, acting on the outer sides of the colloids and promoting flocculation. If the hard-sphere approximation is employed, the osmotic pressure is:

$$p_0= \rho k_\mathrm{B} T$$

where $p_0$ is osmotic pressure and $\rho$ is number density of small spheres and $k_\mathrm{B}$ is the Boltzmann constant.

== Asakura–Oosawa model ==
Depletion forces were first described by Sho Asakura and Fumio Oosawa in 1954. In their model, the force is always considered to be attractive. Additionally, the force is considered to be proportional to the osmotic pressure. The Asakura–Oosawa model assumes low macromolecule densities and that the density distribution, $\rho(r)$, of the macromolecules is constant. Asakura and Oosawa described four cases in which depletion forces would occur. They first described the most general case as two solid plates in a solution of macromolecules. The principles for the first case were then extended to three additional cases.

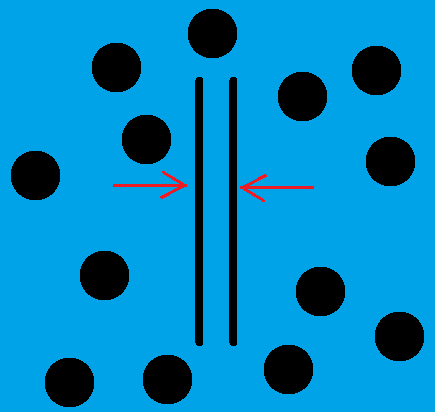
Two plates in a solution of macromolecules. Macromolecules are excluded from between the plates. This results in pure solvent between the plates and a force equal to the osmotic pressure acting upon the plates.

=== Free energy change due to the depletion force ===
In the Asakura–Oosawa model for depletion forces, the change in free-energy imposed by an excluded cosolute, $\Delta G$, is:

$$\Delta G(r)= \Pi \Delta V_{exclusion}$$

where $\Pi$ is the osmotic pressure, and $\Delta V_{exclusion}$ is the change in excluded volume (which is related to molecular size and shape). The very same result can be derived using the Kirkwood-Buff solution theory.

=== Solid plates in a solution of macromolecules ===
In the first case, two solid plates are placed in a solution of rigid spherical macromolecules. If the distance between two plates, $a$, is smaller than the diameter of solute molecules, $d$, then no solute can enter between the plates. This results in pure solvent existing between the plates. The difference in concentration of macromolecules in the solution between the plates and the bulk solution causes a force equal to the osmotic pressure to act on the plates. In a very dilute and monodisperse solution the force is defined by

$$p=k_\mathrm{B}TN \left( \frac{\partial \ln Q}{\partial a} \right)$$

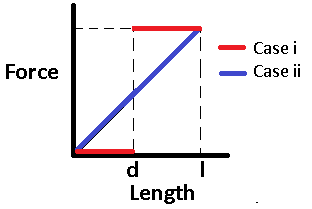
In the first case the force on the plates is zero until the diameter of the macromolecules is larger than the distance between the plates. In case two the force increases as the length of the rods increases.

where $p$ is the force, and $N$ is the total number of solute molecules. The force causes the entropy of the macromolecules to increase and is attractive when $a<d$

=== Rod-like macromolecules ===
Asakura and Oosawa described the second case as consisting of two plates in a solution of rod like macromolecules. The rod like macromolecules are described as having a length, $l$, where $l^2 \ll A$, the area of the plates. As the length of the rods increases, the concentration of the rods between the plates is decreased as it becomes more difficult for the rods to enter between the plates due to steric hindrances. As a result, the force acting on the plates increases with the length of the rods until it becomes equal to the osmotic pressure. In this context, it is worth mentioning that even the isotropic-nematic transition of lyotropic liquid crystals, as first explained in Onsager's theory, can in itself be considered a special case of depletion forces.

=== Plates in a solution of polymers ===
The third case described by Asakura and Oosawa is two plates in a solution of polymers. Due to the size of the polymers, the concentration of polymers in the neighborhood of the plates is reduced, which result the conformational entropy of the polymers being decreased. The case can be approximated by modeling it as diffusion in a vessel with walls which absorb diffusing particles. The force, $p$, can then be calculated according to:

$$p= -Ap_o \Bigg\{(1-f)- a \left( \frac{\partial f}{\partial a} \right) \Bigg\}$$

In this equation $1-f$ is the attraction from the osmotic effect. $\frac{\partial f}{\partial a}$ is the repulsion due to chain molecules confined between plates. $p$ is on order of $\langle r \rangle$, the mean end-to-end distance of chain molecules in free space.

=== Large hard spheres in a solution of small hard spheres ===
The final case described by Asakura and Oosawa describes two large, hard spheres of diameter $D$, in a solution of small, hard spheres of diameter $d$. If the distance between the center of the spheres, $h$, is less than $(D + d)$, then the small spheres are excluded from the space between the large spheres. This results in the area between the large spheres having a reduced concentration of small spheres and therefore reduced entropy. This reduced entropy causes a force to act upon the large spheres pushing them together. This effect was convincingly demonstrated in experiments with vibrofluidized granular materials where attraction can be directly visualized.

== Improvements upon Asakura–Oosawa model ==
=== Derjaguin approximation ===
==== Theory ====
Asakura and Oosawa assumed low concentrations of macromolecules. However, at high concentrations of macromolecules, structural correlation effects in the macromolecular liquid become important. Additionally, the repulsive interaction strength strongly increases for large values of $R/r$ (large radius/small radius). In order to account for these issues, the Derjaguin approximation, which is valid for any type of force law, has been applied to depletion forces. The Derjaguin approximation relates the force between two spheres to the force between two plates. The force is then integrated between small regions on one surface and the opposite surface, which is assumed to be locally flat.

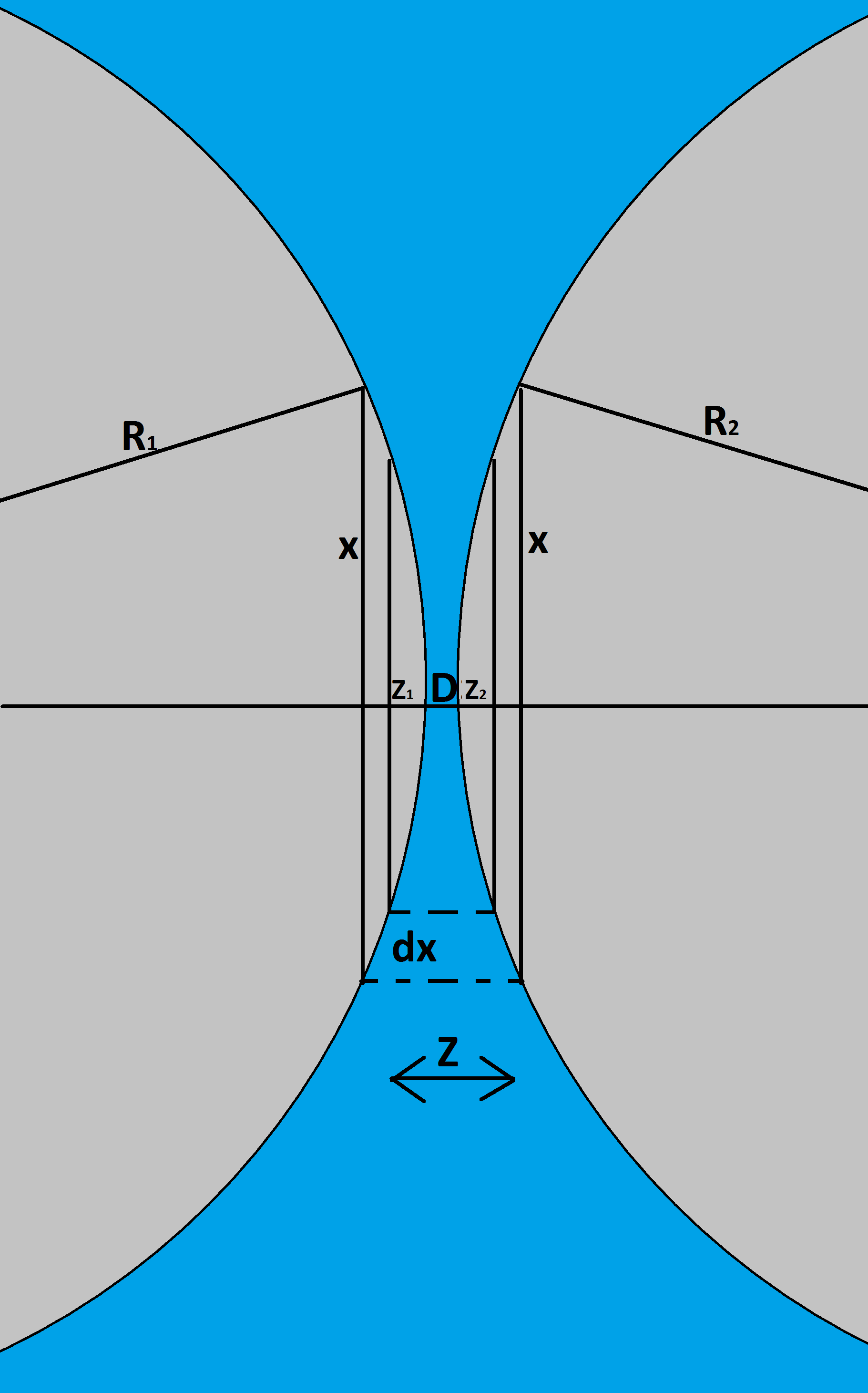
The Derjaguin Approximation relates the force between two spheres to the force between two plates.

==== Equations ====
If there are two spheres of radii $R_1$ and $R_2$ on the $Z$ axis, and the spheres are $h+R_1+R_2$ distance apart, where $h$ is much smaller than $R_1$ and $R_2$, then the force, $F$, in the $z$ direction is

$$F(h) \approx 2 \pi \left( \frac{R_1R_2}{R_1+R_2} \right) W(h)$$

In this equation, $W(h) =\textstyle \int_{h}^{\infty} f(z)dz$, and $f(z)$ is the normal force per unit area between two flat surfaces distance $z$ apart.

When the Derjaguin approximation is applied to depletion forces, and 0 < h < 2R_{S}, then the depletion force given by the Derjaguin approximation is

$$F(h)=- \pi \epsilon \left(R_\text{B}+R_\text{S} \right) \big [p( \rho )(2R_\text{S}-h)+ \gamma ( \rho , \infty) \big ]$$

In this equation, $\epsilon$ is the geometrical factor, which is set to 1, and $\gamma ( \rho , \infty) = 2 \gamma (\rho)$, the interfacial tension at the wall-fluid interface.

=== Density functional theory ===
==== Theory ====
Asakura and Oosawa assumed a uniform particle density, which is true in a homogeneous solution. However, if an external potential is applied to a solution, then the uniform particle density is disrupted, making Asakura and Oosawa's assumption invalid. Density functional theory accounts for variations in particle density by using the grand canonical potential. The grand canonical potential, which is a state function for the grand canonical ensemble, is used to calculate the probability density for microscopic states in macroscopic state. When applied to depletion forces, the grand canonical potential calculates the local particle densities in a solution.

==== Equations ====
Density functional theory states that when any fluid is exposed to an external potential, $V(R)$, then all equilibrium quantities become functions of number density profile, $\rho(R)$. As a result, the total free energy is minimized. The Grand canonical potential, $\Omega \left( \big[ \rho (R) \big] ; \mu , T \right)$, is then written

$$\Omega \left( \big[ \rho (R) \big] ; \mu , T \right) =A \left( \big[ \rho (R) \big] ; T \right)- \int d^3R \big[ \mu - V(R) \big] \rho (R),$$

where $\mu$ is the chemical potential, $T$ is the temperature, and $A [\rho]$ is the helmholtz free energy.

== Enthalpic depletion forces ==
The original Asakura–Oosawa model considered only hard-core interactions. In such an athermal mixture the origin of depletion forces is necessarily entropic. If the intermolecular potentials also include repulsive and/or attractive terms, and if the solvent is considered explicitly, the depletion interaction can have additional thermodynamic contributions.

The notion that depletion forces can also be enthalpically driven has surfaced due to recent experiments regarding protein stabilization induced by compatible osmolytes, such as trehalose, glycerol, and sorbitol. These osmolytes are preferentially excluded from protein surfaces, forming a layer of preferential hydration around the proteins. When the protein folds - this exclusion volume diminishes, making the folded state lower in free energy. Hence the excluded osmolytes shift the folding equilibrium towards the folded state. This effect was generally thought to be an entropic force, in the spirit of the original Asakura–Oosawa model and of macromolecular crowding. However, thermodynamic breakdown of the free-energy gain due to osmolyte addition showed the effect is in fact enthalpically driven, whereas entropy can even be disfavorable.

For many cases, the molecular origin of this enthalpically driven depletion force can be traced to an effective "soft" repulsion in the potential of mean force between macromolecule and cosolute. Both Monte-Carlo simulations and a simple analytic model demonstrate that when the hard-core potential (as in Asakura and Oosawa's model) is supplemented with an additional repulsive "softer" interaction, the depletion force can become enthalpically dominated.

== Measurement and experimentation ==
Depletion forces have been observed and measured using a variety of instrumentation including atomic force microscopy, optical tweezers, and hydrodynamic force balance machines.

=== Atomic force microscopy ===
Atomic force microscopy (AFM) is commonly used to directly measure the magnitude of depletion forces. This method uses the deflection of a very small cantilever contacting a sample which is measured by a laser. The force required to cause a certain amount of beam deflection can be determined from the change in angle of the laser. The small scale of AFM allows for dispersion particles to be measured directly yielding a relatively accurate measurement of depletion forces.

=== Optical tweezers ===
The force required to separate two colloid particles can be measured using optical tweezers. This method uses a focused laser beam to apply an attractive or repulsive force on dielectric micro and nanoparticles. This technique is used with dispersion particles by applying a force which resists depletion forces. The displacement of the particles is then measured and used to find the attractive force between the particles.

=== Hydrodynamic force balance ===
HFB machines measure the strength of particle interactions using liquid flow to separate the particles. This method is used to find depletion force strength by adhering to a static plate one particle in a dispersion particle doublet and applying shear force through fluid flow. The drag created by the dispersion particles resists the depletion force between them, pulling the free particle away from the adhered particle. A force balance of the particles at separation can be used to determine the depletion force between the particles.

== Colloidal destabilization ==
=== Mechanism ===
Depletion forces are used extensively as a method of destabilizing colloids. By introducing particles into a colloidal dispersion, attractive depletion forces can be induced between dispersed particles. These attractive interactions bring the dispersed particles together resulting in flocculation. This destabilizes the colloid as the particles are no longer dispersed in the liquid but concentrated in floc formations. Flocs are then easily removed through filtration processes leaving behind a non-dispersed, pure liquid.

=== Water treatment ===
The use of depletion forces to initiate flocculation is a common process in water treatment. The relatively small size of dispersed particles in waste water renders typical filtration methods ineffective. However, if the dispersion was to be destabilized and flocculation occur, particles can then be filtered out to produce pure water. Therefore, coagulants and flocculants are typically introduced to waste water which create these depletion forces between the dispersed particles.

=== Winemaking ===
Some wine production methods also use depletion forces to remove dispersed particles from wine. Unwanted colloidal particles can be found in wine originating from the must or produced during the winemaking process. These particles typically consist of carbohydrates, pigmentation molecules, or proteins which may adversely affect the taste and purity of the wine. Therefore, flocculants are often added to induce floc precipitation for easy filtration.

=== Common flocculants ===
The table below lists common flocculants along with their chemical formulas, net electrical charge, molecular weight and current applications.

Flocculant	Chemical formula	Charge	Molecular mass (Da)	Application
Aluminum sulfate (alum)	Al_{2}(SO_{4})_{3}	Ionic	342.15	Water treatment
Ferrous sulfate	FeSO_{4}	Ionic	151.91	Water treatment
Polyvinylpolypyrrolidone (PVP)	(C_{6}H_{9}NO)_{n}	Nonionic	2500-2.5 million	Wine and beer clarification
Poly(acrylamide-co-sodium acrylate)	(C_{6}H_{9}NO_{3}Na_{3}	Anionic	10,000 – 1 million	Water treatment and paper production
Polyethylene oxide	C_{2n}H_{4n+2}O_{n+1}	Nonionic	4–8 million	Paper production

== Biological systems ==
There are suggestions that depletion forces may be a significant contributor in some biological systems, specifically in membrane interactions between cells or any membranous structure. With concentrations of large molecules such as proteins or carbohydrates in the extracellular matrix, it is likely some depletion force effects are observed between cells or vesicles that are very close. However, due to the complexity of most biological systems, it is difficult to determine how much these depletion forces influence membrane interactions. Models of vesicle interactions with depletion forces have been developed, but these are greatly simplified and their applicability to real biological systems is questionable.

== Generalization: anisotropic colloids and systems without polymers ==
Depletion forces in colloid-polymer mixtures drive colloids to form aggregates that are densely packed locally. This local dense packing is also observed in colloidal systems without polymer depletants. Without polymer depletants the mechanism is similar, because the particles in dense colloidal suspension act, effectively, as depletants for one another This effect is particularly striking for anisotropically shaped colloidal particles, where the anisotropy of the shape leads to the emergence of directional entropic forces that are responsible for the ordering of hard anisotropic colloids into a wide range of crystal structures.
