= DLVO theory =

Theoretical model for aggregation and stability of aqueous dispersions

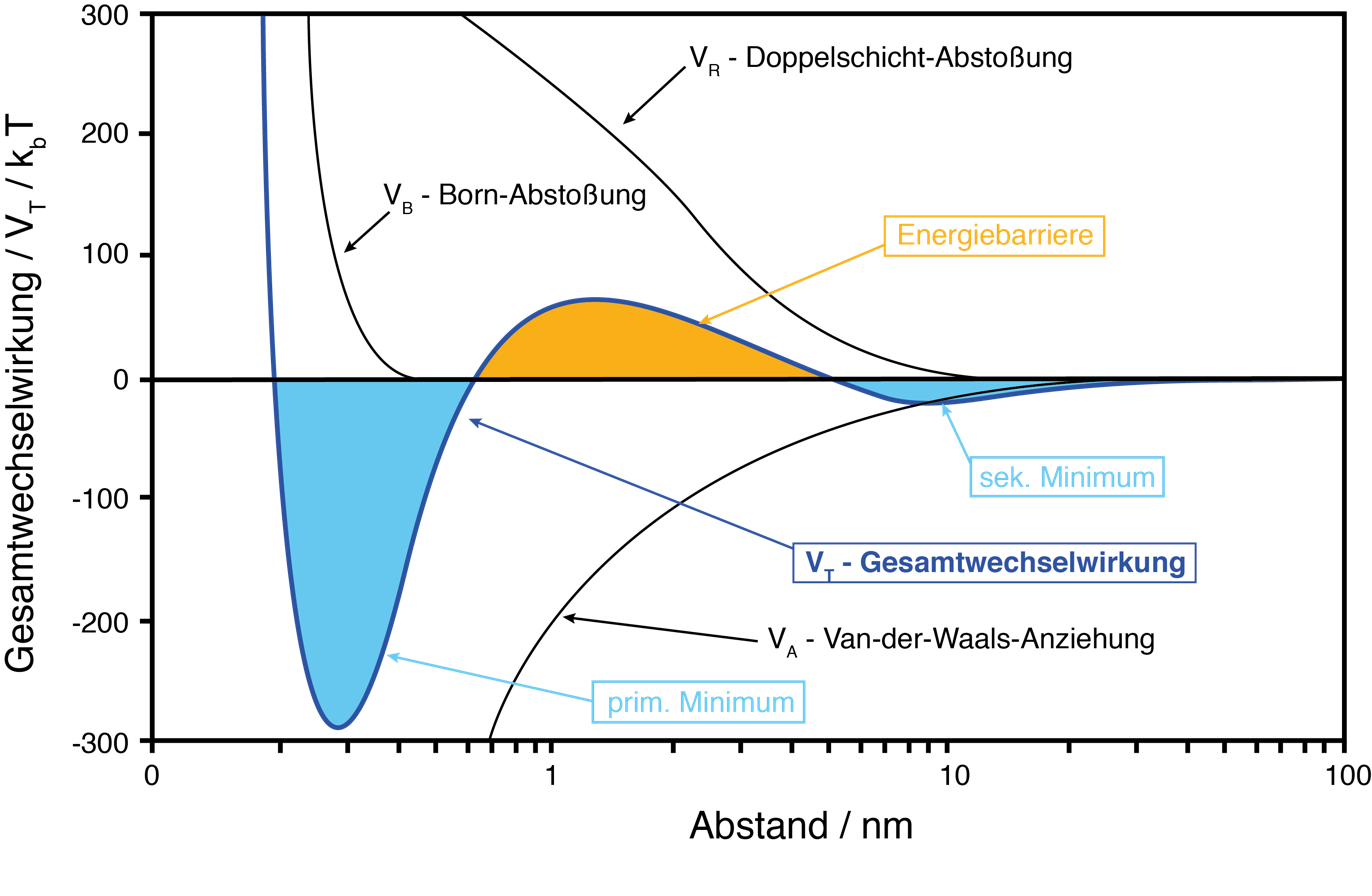
LVO-Theorie

In physical chemistry, the Derjaguin–Landau–Verwey–Overbeek (DLVO) theory explains the aggregation and kinetic stability of aqueous dispersions quantitatively and describes the force between charged surfaces interacting through a liquid medium. It combines the effects of the van der Waals attraction and the electrostatic repulsion due to the so-called double layer of counterions. The electrostatic part of the DLVO interaction is computed in the mean field approximation in the limit of low surface potentials - that is when the potential energy of an elementary charge on the surface is much smaller than the thermal energy scale, $k_\text{B} T$. For two spheres of radius $a$ each having a charge $Z$ (expressed in units of the elementary charge) separated by a center-to-center distance $r$ in a fluid of dielectric constant $\epsilon_r$ containing a concentration $n$ of monovalent ions, the electrostatic potential takes the form of a screened-Coulomb or Yukawa potential,

$$\beta U(r) = Z^2 \lambda_\text{B} \, \left(\frac{e^{\kappa a}}{1 + \kappa a}\right)^2 \, \frac{e^{-\kappa r}}{r},$$

where

- $\lambda_\text{B}$ is the Bjerrum length,
- $U$ is the potential energy,
- $e$ ≈ 2.71828 is Euler's number,
- $\kappa$ is the inverse of the Debye–Hückel screening length ($\lambda_\text{D}$); $\kappa$ is given by $\kappa^2 = 4 \pi \lambda_\text{B} n$, and
- $\beta^{-1} = k_\text{B} T$ is the thermal energy scale at absolute temperature $T$

The DLVO theory is named after Boris Derjaguin and Lev Landau, Evert Verwey and Theodoor Overbeek who developed it between 1941 and 1948.

== Overview ==
DLVO theory is a theory of colloidal dispersion stability in which zeta potential is used to explain that as two particles approach one another their ionic atmospheres begin to overlap and a repulsion force is developed. In this theory, two forces are considered to impact on colloidal stability: Van der Waals forces and electrical double layer forces.

The total potential energy is described as the sum of the attraction potential and the repulsion potential. When two particles approach each other, electrostatic repulsion increases and the interference between their electrical double layers increases. However, the Van der Waals attraction also increases as they get closer. At each distance, the net potential energy of the smaller value is subtracted from the larger value.

At very close distances, the combination of these forces results in a deep attractive well, which is referred to as the primary minimum. At larger distances, the energy profile goes through a maximum, or energy barrier, and subsequently passes through a shallow minimum, which is referred to as the secondary minimum.

At the maximum of the energy barrier, repulsion is greater than attraction. Particles rebound after interparticle contact, and remain dispersed throughout the medium. The maximum energy needs to be greater than the thermal energy. Otherwise, particles will aggregate due to the attraction potential. The height of the barrier indicates how stable the system is. Since particles have to overcome this barrier in order to aggregate, two particles on a collision course must have sufficient kinetic energy due to their velocity and mass. If the barrier is cleared, then the net interaction is all attractive, and as a result the particles aggregate. This inner region is often referred to as an energy trap since the colloids can be considered to be trapped together by Van der Waals forces.

For a colloidal system, the thermodynamic equilibrium state may be reached when the particles are in deep primary minimum. At primary minimum, attractive forces overpower the repulsive forces at low molecular distances. Particles coagulate and this process is not reversible. However, when the maximum energy barrier is too high to overcome, the colloid particles may stay in the secondary minimum, where particles are held together but more weakly than in the primary minimum. Particles form weak attractions but are easily redispersed. Thus, the adhesion at secondary minimum can be reversible.

== History ==
In 1923, Peter Debye and Erich Hückel reported the first successful theory for the distribution of charges in ionic solutions. The framework of linearized Debye–Hückel theory subsequently was applied to colloidal dispersions by S. Levine and G. P. Dube who found that charged colloidal particles should experience a strong medium-range repulsion and a weaker long-range attraction. This theory did not explain the observed instability of colloidal dispersions against irreversible aggregation in solutions of high ionic strength. In 1941, Boris Derjaguin and Lev Landau introduced a theory for the stability of colloidal dispersions that invoked a fundamental instability driven by strong but short-ranged van der Waals attractions countered by the stabilizing influence of electrostatic repulsions. In 1948, Evert Verwey and Theodor Overbeek independently arrived at the same result. This so-called DLVO theory resolved the failure of the Levine–Dube theory to account for the dependence of colloidal dispersions' stability on the ionic strength of the electrolyte.

== Derivation ==
DLVO theory is the combined effect of van der Waals and double layer force. For the derivation, different conditions must be taken into account and different equations can be obtained. But some useful assumptions can effectively simplify the process, which are suitable for ordinary conditions. The simplified way to derive it is to add the two parts together.

=== Van der Waals attraction ===
van der Waals force is actually the total name of dipole-dipole force, dipole-induced dipole force and dispersion forces, in which dispersion forces are the most important part because they are always present. Assume that the pair potential between two atoms or small molecules is purely attractive and of the form w = −C/r^{n}, where C is a constant for interaction energy, decided by the molecule's property and n = 6 for van der Waals attraction. With another assumption of additivity, the net interaction energy between a molecule and planar surface made up of like molecules will be the sum of the interaction energy between the molecule and every molecule in the surface body. So the net interaction energy for a molecule at a distance D away from the surface will therefore be
$$w(D) = -2 \pi \, C \rho _1\, \int_{z=D}^{z= \infty \,} dz \int_{x=0}^{x=\infty \,}\frac{x \, dx}{(z^2+x^2)^3} = \frac{2 \pi C \rho _1}{4} \int_D^\infty \frac{dz}{z^4} = - \frac{ \pi C \rho _1  }{ 6 D^3 }$$

where

- w(r) is the interaction energy between the molecule and the surface,
- $\rho_1$ is the number density of the surface,
- z is the axis perpendicular to the surface and passesding across the molecule, with z = D at the point where the molecule is, and z = 0 at the surface,
- x is the axis perpendicular to the z axis, with x = 0 at the intersection.

Then the interaction energy of a large sphere of radius R and a flat surface can be calculated as
$$W(D) = -\frac{2 \pi C \rho _1 \rho _2}{12} \int_{z=0}^{z=2R}\frac {(2R-z)zdz}{(D+z)^3} \approx  -\frac{ \pi ^2 C \rho _1 \rho _2 R}{6D}$$

where

- W(D) is the interaction energy between the sphere and the surface,
- $\rho_2$ is the number density of the sphere.

For convenience, Hamaker constant A is given as
$$A = \pi^2C\rho_1\rho_2,$$
and the equation becomes
$$W(D) = -\frac{AR}{6D}.$$

With a similar method and according to Derjaguin approximation, the van der Waals interaction energy between particles with different shapes can be calculated, such as energy between

- two spheres: $W(D) = -\frac{A}{6D} \frac{R_1 R_2}{(R_1 +R_2 )},$
- sphere and surface: $W(D) = -\frac{AR}{6D},$
- two surfaces: $W(D) = -\frac{A}{12 \pi D^2}$ per unit area.

=== Double layer force ===
A surface in a liquid may be charged by dissociation of surface groups (e.g. silanol groups for glass or silica surfaces) or by adsorption of charged molecules such as polyelectrolyte from the surrounding solution. This results in the development of a wall surface potential which will attract counterions from the surrounding solution and repel co-ions. In equilibrium, the surface charge is balanced by oppositely charged counterions in solution. The region near the surface of enhanced counterion concentration is called the electrical double layer (EDL). The EDL can be approximated by a sub-division into two regions. Ions in the region closest to the charged wall surface are strongly bound to the surface. This immobile layer is called the Stern or Helmholtz layer. The region adjacent to the Stern layer is called the diffuse layer and contains loosely associated ions that are comparatively mobile. The total electrical double layer due to the formation of the counterion layers results in electrostatic screening of the wall charge and minimizes the Gibbs free energy of EDL formation.

The thickness of the diffuse electric double layer is known as the Debye screening length $1 / \kappa$. At a distance of two Debye screening lengths the electrical potential energy is reduced to 2 percent of the value at the surface wall.

$$\kappa = \sqrt{\sum_i \frac{\rho_{\infty i} e^2z^2_i}{\epsilon_r \epsilon_0 k_\text{B} T}}$$

with unit of m^{−1}, where

- $\rho_{\infty i}$ is the number density of ion i in the bulk solution,
- z is the valency of the ion (for example, H^{+} has a valency of +1, and Ca^{2+} has a valency of +2),
- $\varepsilon_0$ is the vacuum permittivity, $\epsilon_r$ is the relative static permittivity,
- k_{B} is the Boltzmann constant.

The repulsive free energy per unit area between two planar surfaces is shown as
$$W = \frac{64k_\text{B} T\rho_{\infty } \gamma ^2}{\kappa}e^{-\kappa D}$$
where

- $\gamma$ is the reduced surface potential, $\gamma = \tanh\left(\frac{ze\psi_0}{4k_\text{B}T}\right)$,
- $\psi_0$ is the potential on the surface.

The interaction free energy between two spheres of radius R is
$$W = \frac{64\pi k_\text{B} TR\rho_{\infty} \gamma ^2}{\kappa ^2}e^{-\kappa D}.$$

Combining the van der Waals interaction energy and the double layer interaction energy, the interaction between two particles or two surfaces in a liquid can be expressed as
$$W(D) = W(D)_\text{A} + W(D)_\text{R},$$
where W(D)_{R} is the repulsive interaction energy due to electric repulsion, and W(D)_{A} is the attractive interaction energy due to van der Waals interaction.

== Effect of shear flows ==
Alessio Zaccone and collaborators investigated the effects of shear-flow on particle aggregation which can play an important role in applications e.g. microfluidics, chemical reactors, atmospheric and environmental flows. Their work showed a characteristic lag-time in the shear-induced aggregation of the particles, which decreases exponentially with the shear rate.

== Application ==
Since the 1940s, the DLVO theory has been used to explain phenomena found in colloidal science, adsorption and many other fields. Due to the more recent popularity of nanoparticle research, DLVO theory has become even more popular because it can be used to explain behavior of both material nanoparticles such as fullerene particles and microorganisms. For example, DLVO theory has been widely applied to assess the degree of particle-particle interactions at controlled chemical conditions. For example, it has been used to investigate the colloidal stability of BaSO_{4} (barium sulfate). and particle-particle interactions between magnesite, dolomite, quartz and serpentine.

== Shortcomings ==
Additional forces beyond the DLVO construct have been reported to also play a major role in determining colloid stability. DLVO theory is not effective in describing ordering processes such as the evolution of colloidal crystals in dilute dispersions with low salt concentrations. It also cannot explain the relation between the formation of colloidal crystals and salt concentrations.
