= Theodoor Overbeek =

Dutch chemist, co-author of the DLVO theory on colloids suspension stability

Jan Theodoor Gerard Overbeek
- Born: January 30, 1911; Groningen
- Died: February 19, 2007 (aged 96)
- Education: Utrecht University
- Known for: DLVO theory
- Scientific career
- Workplaces: Ghent University; Utrecht University
- Thesis: Theorie der electrophorese : het relaxatie-effect (1941)
- Doctoral students: Emmie Lucassen-Reynders

Jan Theodoor Gerard Overbeek (Groningen, January 30, 1911 – February 19, 2007) was a Dutch professor of physical chemistry at Utrecht University. He is known for his work on colloids, specially for the development of the DLVO theory.

== Early life and education ==
Overbeek was born in Groningen. Overbeek's family moved to Rotterdam in 1913 and to Breda in 1925. Overbeek went to study chemistry (from 1928 to 1933) at the Utrecht University. He spent a year in military service and then worked for two years in Belgium. First year he worked with Jacques Errera at the Université libre de Bruxelles, after that a year with Arend Joan Rutgers at Ghent University.

He received his doctorate on May 19, 1941, with a thesis titled "Theory of Electrophoresis, the Relaxation Effect" (Dutch: Theorie der electrophorese: het relaxatie-effect). All the characteristic features of the later work of Overbeek were present already in his thesis: formation of a simple model with the available data, set up the corresponding equations and then rigorous mathematical elaboration. Overbeek's dissertation explored the role of the deformation of the electrical double layer surrounding a charged colloidal particle which was set in motion by an external electric field.

== Research and career ==
After graduation Overbeek joined Philips, where Evert Verwey, was his immediate boss. In addition to work on luminescent screens they worked together on the interaction between colloidal particles. Attraction, based on the summation of the London and van der Waals interactions between the atoms was established in 1937 by Hugo Christiaan Hamaker who also worked at Philips. However, the details on the repulsion produced by the electric double layer around colloidal particles were not so clear. By using thermodynamic considerations, the relevant free energies were calculated and interaction potential were derived. This research resulted in a seminal work Theory of the Stability of Lyophobic Colloids. The work had a great influence, and is still used by considerations about the stability of colloids, but also in various other fields where charged surfaces interact with each other. The whole of that theory is now known as DLVO (Derjaguin, Landau, Verwey, Overbeek) theory.

In 1946, Overbeek became a professor of physical chemistry at the Utrecht University. He picked up a wide range of problems which, despite their different forms, always had the same distinctive approach. For Overbeek method was simple, theoretical model, selected experiments, rigorous calculations and testing the model with experimental sets.

Overbeek also remained active after his retirement in 1981. His passion at that time was the understanding of the phenomenon of micro-emulsions, which were more stable in comparison to the conventional macro-emulsions.

== Honors and awards ==
For his pioneering work Overbeek received several prestigious awards. He received honorary degrees from Clarkson University and University of Bristol. In 1989 he received the Wolfgang Ostwald Prize. He received honorary memberships of the Royal Netherlands Chemical Society. He was elected a member of the Royal Netherlands Academy of Arts and Sciences in 1953.

Every year European Colloid and Interface Society awards Overbeek Gold Medal, which is a prize named after Theodoor Overbeek. "The Overbeek Gold Medal honours leadership and scientific excellence in the field of colloid and interface science over an entire career." The first prize in 2005 was handed over to Overbeek himself.
