= Creaming (chemistry) =

Floating upwards of a layer of emulsion

Creaming, in the laboratory sense, is the migration of the dispersed phase of an emulsion under the influence of buoyancy. The particles float upwards or sink depending on how large they are and density compared to the continuous phase as well as how viscous or how thixotropic the continuous phase might be. For as long as the particles remain separated, the process is called creaming.

Where it is important that either the form or the concentration of the emulsion should be stable, it is desirable that the continuous and the dispersed phases should have similar densities and it also is desirable that the continuous phase should be viscous or thixotropic. Thixotropy is particularly valuable in paints, sauces, and similar products, partly because it counteracts tendencies towards creaming. It also is important that the particles be as small as practicable because that reduces their tendency to migrate under the influence of buoyant forces due to Brownian motion, which keeps the particles in suspension. The electric charges on their surfaces should preferably tend to be uniform, so that the particles repel rather than attract each other.

Creaming is usually seen as undesirable because it causes difficulties in storage and handling and can be dangerous in health care settings by causing a fat embolism (fat in the blood stream) or occluding capillaries (blockage of capillaries) if an emulsion that has undergone creaming is administered intravenously. It can be useful in special cases especially where it is desirable to concentrate an emulsion. A particular example is in the separation of dairy cream, either to achieve a desired concentration of butterfat, or to make butter. Depending on whether the dispersed particles are less dense or more dense than the continuous phase, they may move either to the top or bottom of a sample. In this it differs from flocculation (where particles clump) or emulsion breaking (where particles coalesce). Unlike flocculation and breaking, creaming of an emulsion is a relatively simple process to reverse.

== Creaming ==
A creamed emulsion increases the likelihood of coalescence due to the close proximity of the globules in the cream. Factors that influence the rate of creaming are similar to those involved in the sedimentation rate of suspension particles. Stokes Law is inadequate to predict creaming but can be used to identify these factors.

Creaming of an emulsion also increases the tendency of an emulsion to inversion. This class of process occurs mainly in special cases, when both the continuous and dispersed phases of an emulsion are liquid, as commonly is the state in dairy cream. It is common where the volume of the two fluid components is about the same or the volume of the dispersed phase is larger than that of the continuous phase. The process of emulsion inversion occurs when the dispersed droplets unite, but retain the formerly continuous material as droplets within the mass.

This is an "invert emulsion" or "inverted emulsion", in which the formerly continuous phase has become the dispersed phase and vice versa. Inversion happens in dairy cream when the butterfat concentration is too high and the resulting invert emulsion looks much like butter.

Commonly invert emulsions look much like a paste or thick cream and typical examples are mayonnaise, margarine (especially "low-fat" grades of margarine), pharmaceutical ointments, and cosmetic "creams".

Emulsion inversion differs from emulsion breaking in that a breaking emulsion tends to separate the two phases into un-emulsified continuous phases. Inversion of an emulsion may or may not be difficult to invert, but generally more difficult than creaming.
