= Macromolecular crowding =

Effect of high concentrations of macromolecules in living cells

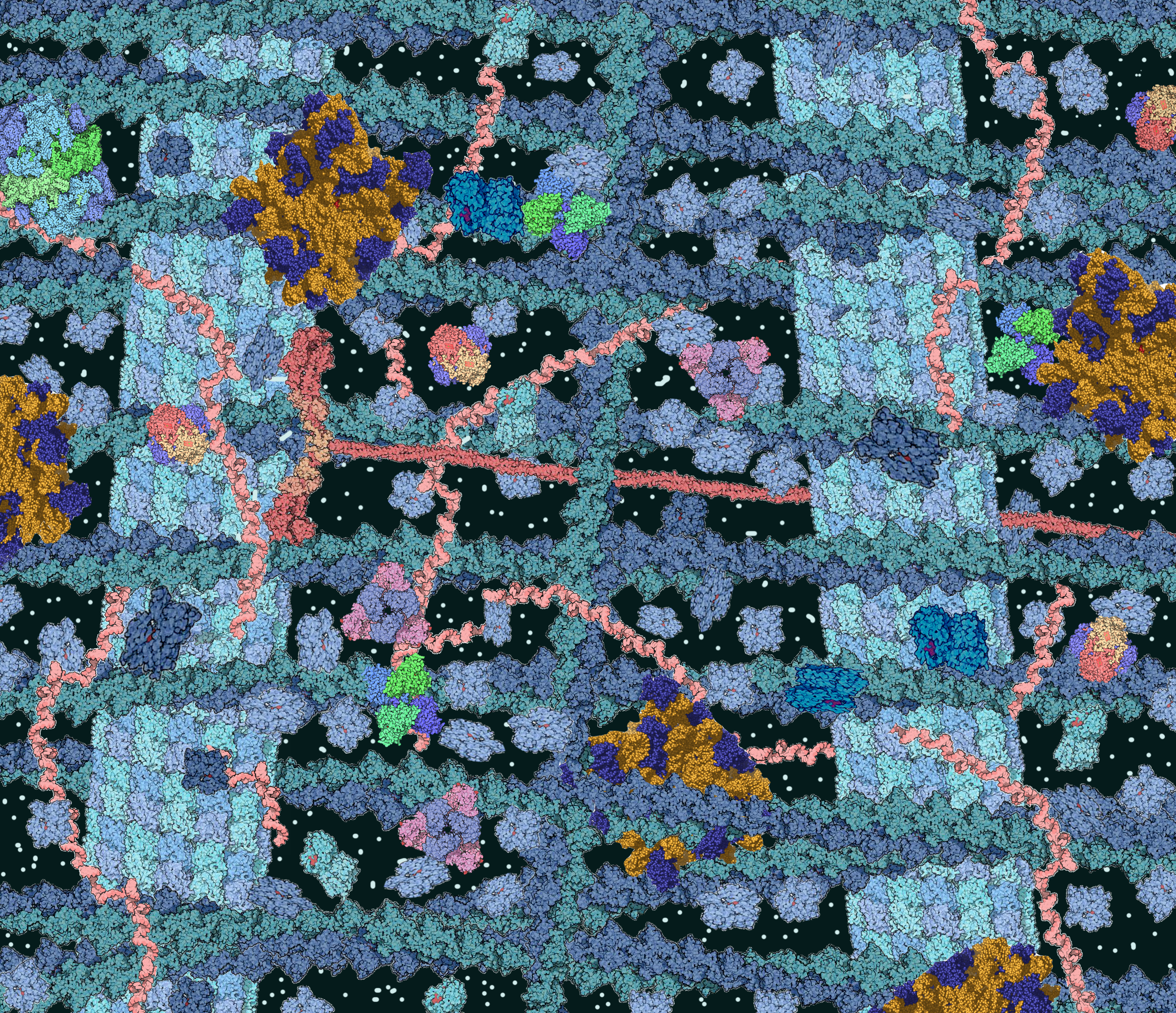
Macromolecular crowding in the cytosol of cells alters the properties of macromolecules such as proteins and nucleic acids.

The phenomenon of macromolecular crowding alters the properties of molecules in a solution when high concentrations of macromolecules such as proteins are present. Such conditions occur routinely in living cells; for instance, the cytosol of Escherichia coli contains about 300–400 mg/ml of macromolecules. Crowding occurs since these high concentrations of macromolecules reduce the volume of solvent available for other molecules in the solution, which has the result of increasing their effective concentrations. Crowding can promote formation of a biomolecular condensate by colloidal phase separation. While macromolecular crowding is traditionally known for driving the liquid–liquid phase separation (LLPS) of large polymers like proteins and nucleic acids, it has been demonstrated to similarly induce phase separation in small metabolite molecules such as adenosine triphosphate (ATP).

This crowding effect can make molecules in cells behave in radically different ways than in test-tube assays. Consequently, measurements of the properties of enzymes or processes in metabolism that are made in the laboratory (in vitro) in dilute solutions may be different by many orders of magnitude from the true values seen in living cells (in vivo). The study of biochemical processes under realistically crowded conditions is very important, since these conditions are a ubiquitous property of all cells and crowding may be essential for the efficient operation of metabolism. Indeed, in vitro studies have shown that crowding greatly influences binding stability of proteins to DNA.

== Cause and effects ==
The interior of cells is a crowded environment. For example, an Escherichia coli cell is only about 2 micrometres (μm) long and 0.5 μm in diameter, with a cell volume of 0.6 - 0.7 μm^{3}. However, E. coli can contain up to 4,288 different types of proteins, and about 1,000 of these types are produced at a high enough level to be easily detected. Added to this mix are various forms of RNA and the cell's DNA chromosome, giving a total concentration of macromolecules of between 300 and 400 mg/ml. In eukaryotes, the cell's interior is further crowded by the protein filaments that make up the cytoskeleton; this meshwork divides the cytosol into a network of narrow pores.

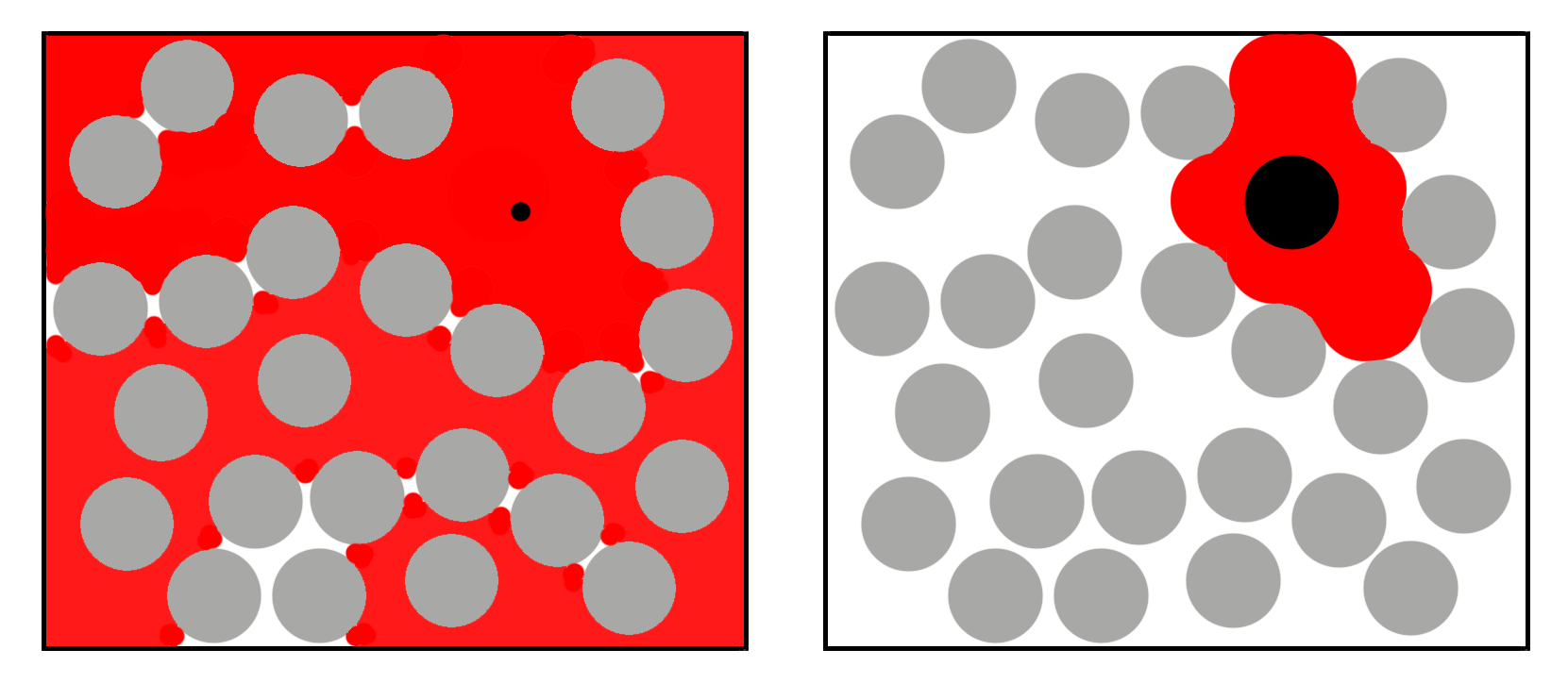
The volume of accessible solvent (red) for two molecules of widely different sizes (black circles) at high concentrations of macromolecules (grey circles). Reducing the available volume increases the effective concentration of macromolecules.

These high concentrations of macromolecules occupy a large proportion of the volume of the cell, which reduces the volume of solvent that is available for other macromolecules. This excluded volume effect increases the effective concentration of macromolecules (increasing their chemical activity), which in turn alters the rates and equilibrium constants of their reactions. In particular this effect alters dissociation constants by favoring the association of macromolecules, such as when multiple proteins come together to form protein complexes, or when DNA-binding proteins bind to their targets in the genome. Crowding may also affect enzyme reactions involving small molecules if the reaction involves a large change in the shape of the enzyme.

The size of the crowding effect depends on both the molecular mass and shape of the molecule involved, although mass seems to be the major factor – with the effect being stronger with larger molecules. Notably, the size of the effect is non-linear, so macromolecules are much more strongly affected than are small molecules such as amino acids or simple sugars. Macromolecular crowding is therefore an effect exerted by large molecules on the properties of other large molecules.

== Importance ==
Macromolecular crowding is an important effect in biochemistry and cell biology. For example, the increase in the strength of interactions between proteins and DNA produced by crowding may be of key importance in processes such as transcription and DNA replication. Crowding has also been suggested to be involved in processes as diverse as the aggregation of hemoglobin in sickle-cell disease, and the responses of cells to changes in their volume.

The importance of crowding in protein folding is of particular interest in biophysics. Here, the crowding effect can accelerate the folding process, since a compact folded protein will occupy less volume than an unfolded protein chain. However, crowding can reduce the yield of correctly folded protein by increasing protein aggregation. Crowding may also increase the effectiveness of chaperone proteins such as GroEL in the cell, which could counteract this reduction in folding efficiency. It has also been shown that macromolecular crowding affects protein-folding dynamics as well as overall protein shape where distinct conformational changes are accompanied by secondary structure alterations implying that crowding-induced shape changes may be important for protein function and malfunction in vivo.

A particularly striking example of the importance of crowding effects involves the crystallins that fill the interior of the lens. These proteins have to remain stable and in solution for the lens to be transparent; precipitation or aggregation of crystallins causes cataracts. Crystallins are present in the lens at extremely high concentrations, over 500 mg/ml, and at these levels crowding effects are very strong. The large crowding effect adds to the thermal stability of the crystallins, increasing their resistance to denaturation. This effect may partly explain the extraordinary resistance shown by the lens to damage caused by high temperatures.

Crowding may also play a role in diseases that involve protein aggregation, such as sickle cell anemia where mutant hemoglobin forms aggregates and Alzheimer's disease, where tau protein forms neurofibrillary tangles under crowded conditions within neurons.

== Study ==
Due to macromolecular crowding, enzyme assays and biophysical measurements performed in dilute solution may fail to reflect the actual process and its kinetics taking place in the cytosol. One approach to produce more accurate measurements would be to use highly concentrated extracts of cells, to try to maintain the cell contents in a more natural state. However, such extracts contain many kinds of biologically active molecules, which can interfere with the phenomena being studied. Consequently, crowding effects are mimicked in vitro by adding high concentrations of relatively inert molecules such as polyethylene glycol, ficoll, dextran, or serum albumin to experimental media. However, using such artificial crowding agents can be complicated, as these crowding molecules can sometimes interact in other ways with the process being examined, such as by binding weakly to one of the components.

== Macromolecular crowding and protein folding ==
A major importance of macromolecular crowding to biological systems stems from its effect on protein folding. The underlying physical mechanism by which macromolecular crowding helps to stabilize proteins in their folded state is often explained in terms of excluded volume - the volume inaccessible to the proteins due to their interaction with macromolecular crowders. This notion goes back to Asakura and Oosawa, who have described depletion forces induced by steric, hard-core, interactions. A hallmark of the mechanism inferred from the above is that the effect is completely a-thermal, and thus completely entropic. These ideas were also proposed to explain why small cosolutes, namely protective osmolytes, which are preferentially excluded from proteins, also shift the protein folding equilibrium towards the folded state. However, it has been shown by various methods, both experimental and theoretical, that depletion forces are not always entropic in nature.

== See also ==
- Ideal solution
- Colligative properties
