= Colloid and Polymer Science =

- Discipline: Chemistry
- Language: English
- Edited by: Christine M. Papadakis and Yu Zhu

Publication details
- Former name(s): Kolloid-Zeitschrift, Zeitschrift für Polymere
- History: 1906-present
- Publisher: Springer (Germany)
- Frequency: monthly
- Impact factor: 1.931 (2020)

Standard abbreviations
- ISO 4: Colloid Polym. Sci.

Indexing
- ISSN: 0303-402X (print); 1435-1536 (web)

Links
- Journal homepage; online access

Colloid and Polymer Science is a peer-reviewed scientific journal which publishes in the field of colloid and polymer science and its interdisciplinary interactions. The journal is published by Springer Science+Business Media. It was first published in 1906.

== Impact factor ==
Colloid and Polymer Science had a 2021 impact factor of 2.434.

== Editors ==
The editors in chief of the journal are C.M. Papadakis (TU Munich) and A. Schmidt (U Köln), and chief advisory editor is F. Kremer (University Leipzig).
