= Advances in Colloid and Interface Science =

- Discipline: Colloid and interface science
- Language: English
- Edited by: R. Miller, R. Sedev, H. Zeng

Publication details
- History: 1967-present
- Publisher: Elsevier
- Frequency: Quarterly
- Impact factor: 19.3 (2024)

Standard abbreviations
- ISO 4: Adv. Colloid Interface Sci.

Indexing
- CODEN: ACISB9
- ISSN: 0001-8686
- LCCN: 75009703
- OCLC no.: 1164308

Links
- Journal homepage; Online archive

Advances in Colloid and Interface Science is a quarterly peer-reviewed scientific journal published by Elsevier. It covers all aspects of colloid and interface science, including surface chemistry, physical chemistry, and surface tension.

== Abstracting and indexing ==
The journal is abstracted and indexed in Applied Polymers Literature, Chemical Abstracts Service, Current Contents/Physics, Chemical, & Earth Sciences, PASCAL, and Scopus. According to the Journal Citation Reports, the journal has a 2020 impact factor of 12.984.

== See also ==
- Journal of Colloid and Interface Science
- Current Opinion in Colloid & Interface Science
