= Current Opinion in Colloid & Interface Science =

- Discipline: Colloid and interface science
- Language: English
- Edited by: Dganit Danino and Marie Pierre Krafft

Publication details
- History: 1996–present
- Publisher: Elsevier
- Frequency: Bimonthly
- Impact factor: 8.209 (2021)

Standard abbreviations
- ISO 4: Curr. Opin. Colloid Interface Sci.

Indexing
- CODEN: COCSFL
- ISSN: 1359-0294
- LCCN: 96644451
- OCLC no.: 43658404

Links
- Journal homepage; Online access

Current Opinion in Colloid & Interface Science is a bimonthly peer-reviewed scientific journal published by Elsevier. It covers the field of physical chemistry, especially research on colloids and interfaces. The journal was established in 1996 and the editors-in-chiefs are Dganit Danino and Marie Pierre Krafft. According to the Journal Citation Reports, the journal has a 2021 impact factor of 8.209.

== See also ==
- Advances in Colloid and Interface Science
- Current Opinion (Elsevier)
- Journal of Colloid and Interface Science
