= Evert Verwey =

Dutch chemist (1905–1981)

Evert Johannes Willem Verwey, also Verweij, (30 April 1905 in Amsterdam – 13 February 1981 in Utrecht) was a Dutch chemist, who also did research in physical chemistry. He is known for DLVO theory, a theory of the interaction of charged surfaces in fluids, which has applications, for example, in the description of colloids. The Verwey transition in magnetite is named after him.

== Education ==
Verwey studied chemistry at the University of Amsterdam and obtained his MSc (Dutch: Doctoraal Examen) in 1929. From 1931 he worked as an assistant at the University of Groningen, where he obtained his PhD under the guidance of Hugo Rudolph Kruyt (1934, cum laude).

== Career ==
In 1934 he moved to the Philips Laboratories in Eindhoven. He continued work on colloids, which was also the topic of his dissertation, and on oxides.

Some of his studies on transition metal oxides (carried out jointly with Jan Hendrik de Boer) showed that some transition-metal oxides had electrical properties that could not be explained on the basis of band theory.

Between 1946 and 1967, together with physicist Hendrik Casimir and the engineer Herre Rinia, he was director of the Philips Laboratories.

In 1949 he became a member of the Royal Netherlands Academy of Arts and Sciences. In 1967 he was awarded an honorary doctorate by the Delft University of Technology. He was also a curator at the University of Utrecht.

He was married to the sociologist and politician Hilda Verwey-Jonker (1908–2004).

== See also ==
- Charge ordering
- Metal–insulator transition
