= Colloids and Surfaces =

- Discipline: Colloid and interface science
- Language: English

Publication details
- History: 1980–1992
- Publisher: Elsevier
- Impact factor: Colloids and Surfaces A: 4.539; Colloids and Surfaces B: 5.268 (2020)

Standard abbreviations
- ISO 4: Colloids Surf.

Indexing
- ISSN: 0166-6622

Links
- Journal homepage; Online access

Colloids and Surfaces A
- Discipline: Colloid and interface science
- Language: English
- Edited by: M. Adler, F. Grieser, J.B. Li, D. Prieve

Publication details
- History: 1993–present
- Publisher: Elsevier
- Frequency: Biweekly
- Impact factor: 3.131 (2018)

Standard abbreviations
- ISO 4: Colloids Surf. A

Indexing
- ISSN: 0927-7757

Links
- Journal homepage; Online access

Colloids and Surfaces B
- Discipline: Colloid and interface science
- Language: English
- Edited by: J.L. Brash, H.J. Busscher, H. Chen, D. Danino

Publication details
- History: 1993–present
- Publisher: Elsevier
- Frequency: monthly
- Impact factor: 4.152 (2014)

Standard abbreviations
- ISO 4: Colloids Surf. B

Indexing
- ISSN: 0927-7765

Links
- Journal homepage; Online access

Colloids and Surfaces is a peer-reviewed journal of surface science. It was established in 1980. In 1993, it split into two parts Colloids and Surfaces A and Colloids and Surfaces B. The journal is published by Elsevier.

== Colloids and Surfaces A ==
Colloids and Surfaces A: Physicochemical and Engineering Aspects focused on aspects related to applications of colloids and interfacial phenomena. The journal is published biweekly jointly edited by M. Adler, F. Grieser, J.B. Li and D. Prieve

== Colloids and Surfaces B ==
Colloids and Surfaces B: Biointerfaces focuses on the biological aspects. It is published monthly jointly edited by J.L. Brash, H.J. Busscher, H. Chen and D. Danino.
