= Dispersion (chemistry) =

Chemical mixtures

IUPAC definition

Material comprising more than one phase where at least one of the phases consists of finely divided phase domains, often in the colloidal size range, dispersed throughout a continuous phase.

Note 1: Modification of definition in ref.

A dispersion is a system in which distributed particles of one material are dispersed in a continuous phase of another material. The two phases may be in the same or different states of matter.

Dispersions are classified in a number of different ways, including how large the particles are in relation to the particles of the continuous phase, whether or not precipitation occurs, and the presence of Brownian motion. In general, dispersions of particles sufficiently large for sedimentation are called suspensions, while those of smaller particles are called colloids and solutions.

== Structure and properties ==
It is widely assumed that dispersions do not display any structure; i.e., the particles (or in case of emulsions: droplets) dispersed in the liquid or solid matrix (the "dispersion medium") are assumed to be statistically distributed. Therefore, for dispersions, usually percolation theory is assumed to appropriately describe their properties.

However, percolation theory can be applied only if the system it should describe is in or close to thermodynamic equilibrium. There are some studies about the structure of dispersions (emulsions), although they are plentiful in type and in use all over the world in innumerable applications (see below). Based on experimental evidence showing complex structures in dispersions, it was proposed to understand dispersions (colloidal systems in general) as non-equilibrium systems.

In the following, only such dispersions with a dispersed phase diameter of less than 1 μm will be discussed. To understand the formation and properties of such dispersions (incl emulsions), it must be considered that the dispersed phase exhibits a "surface", which is covered ("wet") by a different "surface" that, hence, are forming an interface. Both surfaces have to be created (which requires a huge amount of energy), and the interfacial tension (difference of surface tension) is not compensating the energy input, if at all.

Experimental evidence suggests dispersions have a structure very much different from any kind of statistical distribution (which would be characteristics for a system in thermodynamic equilibrium), but in contrast display structures similar to self-organisation, which can be described by non-equilibrium thermodynamics. This is the reason why some liquid dispersions turn to become gels or even solid at a concentration of a dispersed phase above a critical concentration (which is dependent on particle size and interfacial tension). Also, the sudden appearance of conductivity in a system of a dispersed conductive phase in an insulating matrix has been explained.

== Dispersion description ==
Dispersion is a process by which (in the case of solid dispersing in a liquid) agglomerated particles are separated from each other, and a new interface between the inner surface of the liquid dispersion medium and the surface of the dispersed particles is generated. This process is facilitated by molecular diffusion and convection.

With respect to molecular diffusion, dispersion occurs as a result of an unequal concentration of the introduced material throughout the bulk medium. When the dispersed material is first introduced into the bulk medium, the region at which it is introduced then has a higher concentration of that material than any other point in the bulk. This unequal distribution results in a concentration gradient that drives the dispersion of particles in the medium so that the concentration is constant across the entire bulk. With respect to convection, variations in velocity between flow paths in the bulk facilitate the distribution of the dispersed material into the medium.

Although both transport phenomena contribute to the dispersion of a material into the bulk, the mechanism of dispersion is primarily driven by convection in cases where there is significant turbulent flow in the bulk. Diffusion is the dominant mechanism in the process of dispersion in cases of little to no turbulence in the bulk, where molecular diffusion is able to facilitate dispersion over a long period of time. These phenomena are reflected in common real-world events. The molecules in a drop of food coloring added to water will eventually disperse throughout the entire medium, where the effects of molecular diffusion are more evident. However, stirring the mixture with a spoon will create turbulent flows in the water that accelerate the process of dispersion through convection-dominated dispersion.

== Degree of dispersion ==
The term dispersion also refers to the physical property of the degree to which particles clump together into agglomerates or aggregates. While the two terms are often used interchangeably, according to ISO nanotechnology definitions, an agglomerate is a reversible collection of particles weakly bound, for example by van der Waals forces or physical entanglement, whereas an aggregate is composed of irreversibly bonded or fused particles, for example through covalent bonds. A full quantification of dispersion would involve the size, shape, and number of particles in each agglomerate or aggregate, the strength of the interparticle forces, their overall structure, and their distribution within the system. However, the complexity is usually reduced by comparing the measured size distribution of "primary" particles to that of the agglomerates or aggregates. When discussing suspensions of solid particles in liquid media, the zeta potential is most often used to quantify the degree of dispersion, with suspensions possessing a high absolute value of zeta potential being considered as well-dispersed.

== Types of dispersions ==
A solution describes a homogeneous mixture where the dispersed particles will not settle if the solution is left undisturbed for a prolonged period of time.

A colloid is a heterogeneous mixture where the dispersed particles have at least in one direction a dimension roughly between 1 nm and 1 μm or that in a system discontinuities are found at distances of that order.

A suspension is a heterogeneous dispersion of larger particles in a medium. Unlike solutions and colloids, if left undisturbed for a prolonged period of time, the suspended particles will settle out of the mixture.

Although suspensions are relatively simple to distinguish from solutions and colloids, it may be difficult to distinguish solutions from colloids since the particles dispersed in the medium may be too small to distinguish by the human eye. Instead, the Tyndall effect is used to distinguish solutions and colloids. Due to the various reported definitions of solutions, colloids, and suspensions provided in the literature, it is difficult to label each classification with a specific particle size range. The International Union of Pure and Applied Chemistry attempts to provide a standard nomenclature for colloids as particles in a size range having a dimension roughly between 1 nm and 1 μm.

In addition to the classification by particle size, dispersions can also be labeled by the combination of the dispersed phase and the medium phase that the particles are suspended in. Aerosols are liquids dispersed in a gas, sols are solids in liquids, emulsions are liquids dispersed in liquids (more specifically a dispersion of two immiscible liquids), and gels are liquids dispersed in solids.

| Components phases | | Homogeneous mixture | Heterogeneous mixture | |
| Dispersed material | Continuous medium | Solution: Rayleigh scattering effect on visible light | Colloid (smaller particles): Tyndall effect on visible light near the surface | Suspension (larger particles): no significant effect on visible light |
|---|---|---|---|---|
| Gas | Gas | Gas mixture: air (oxygen and other gases in nitrogen) | not possible | |
| Liquid | Gas | | Aerosol: fog, mist, vapor, hair sprays, moisted air | Aerosol: rain (also produces rainbows by refraction on water droplets) |
| Solid | Gas | | Solid aerosol: smoke, cloud, air particulates | Solid aerosol: dust, sand storm, ice fog, pyroclastic flow |
| Gas | Liquid | Oxygen in water | Foam: whipped cream, shaving cream | Bubbling foam, boiling water, sodas and sparkling beverages |
| Liquid | Liquid | Alcoholic beverages (cocktails), sirups | Emulsion: miniemulsion, microemulsion, milk, mayonnaise, hand cream, hydrated soap | unstable emulsion of a soap bubble (at ambient temperature, with iridescent effect on light caused by evaporation of water; the suspension of liquids is still maintained by surfacic tension with the gas inside and outside the bubble and surfactants effects decreasing with evaporation; finally the bubble will pop when there's no more emulsion and the shearing effect of micelles will outweight the surface tension lost by evaporation of water out of them) |
| Solid | Liquid | Sugar in water | Sol: pigmented ink, blood | Mud (soil, clay or silt particles suspended in water, lahar, quicksand), wet plaster/cement/concrete, chalk powder suspended in water, lava flow (mix of melted and solid rock), melting ice creams |
| Gas | Solid | Hydrogen in metals | Solid foam: aerogel, styrofoam, pumice | |
| Liquid | Solid | Amalgam (mercury in gold), hexane in paraffin wax | Gel: agar, gelatin, silicagel, opal; frozen ice creams | |
| Solid | Solid | Alloys, plasticizers in plastics | Solid sol: cranberry glass | natural rocks, dried plaster/cement/concrete, frozen soap bubble |

== Examples of dispersions ==
Milk is a commonly cited example of an emulsion, a specific type of dispersion of one liquid into another liquid where the two liquids are immiscible. The fat molecules suspended in milk provide a mode of delivery of important fat-soluble vitamins and nutrients from the mother to newborn. The mechanical, thermal, or enzymatic treatment of milk manipulates the integrity of these fat globules and results in a wide variety of dairy products.

Oxide dispersion-strengthened alloy (ODS) is an example of oxide particle dispersion into a metal medium, which improves the high temperature tolerance of the material. Therefore these alloys have several applications in the nuclear energy industry, where materials must withstand extremely high temperatures to maintain operation.

The degradation of coastal aquifers is a direct result of seawater intrusion and dispersion into the aquifer following excessive use of the aquifer. When an aquifer is depleted for human use, it is naturally replenished by groundwater moving in from other areas. In the case of coastal aquifers, the water supply is replenished both from the land boundary on one side and the sea boundary on the other side. After excessive discharge, saline water from the sea boundary will enter the aquifer and disperse in the freshwater medium, threatening the viability of the aquifer for human use. Several different solutions to seawater intrusion in coastal aquifers have been proposed, including engineering methods of artificial recharge and implementing physical barriers at the sea boundary.

Chemical dispersants are used in oil spills to mitigate the effects of the spill and promote the degradation of oil particles. The dispersants effectively isolate pools on oil sitting on the surface of the water into smaller droplets that disperse into the water, which lowers the overall concentration of oil in the water to prevent any further contamination or impact on marine biology and coastal wildlife.
