= Colloid =

Mixture of an insoluble substance microscopically dispersed throughout another substance

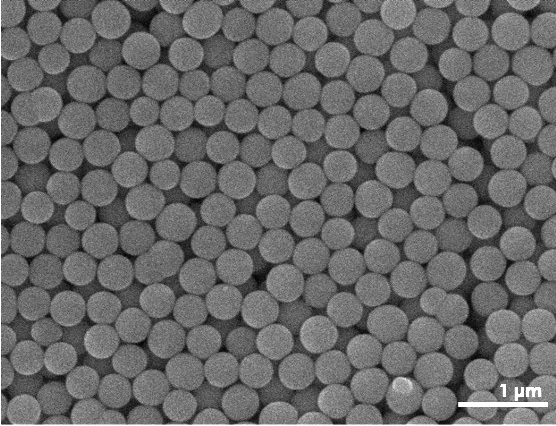
Scanning electron microscope image of a colloid

A colloid is a mixture in which one substance, consisting of microscopically dispersed insoluble particles, is suspended throughout another substance. Some definitions specify that the particles must be dispersed in a liquid, while others extend the definition to include substances like aerosols and gels. A colloid has a dispersed phase (the suspended particles) and a continuous phase (the medium of suspension). The term colloidal suspension refers unambiguously to the overall mixture. (In a narrower sense, a colloid is distinguished from other types of suspension by the smaller particle size.)

Some colloids are translucent because of the Tyndall effect, which is the scattering of light by particles in the colloid. Other colloids may be opaque or have a slight color.

Colloidal suspensions are the subject of interface and colloid science. This field of study began in 1845 with Francesco Selmi, who called them pseudosolutions, and was later expanded by Michael Faraday and Thomas Graham, who coined the term colloid in 1861.

== Definition ==
IUPAC definition

Colloid: Short synonym for colloidal system.

Colloidal: State of subdivision such that the molecules or polymolecular particles dispersed in a medium have at least one dimension between approximately 1 nm and 1 μm, or that in a system discontinuities are found at distances of that order.

Since the definition of a colloid is so ambiguous, the International Union of Pure and Applied Chemistry (IUPAC) formalized a modern definition of colloids:

The term colloidal refers to a state of subdivision, implying that the molecules or polymolecular particles dispersed in a medium have at least in one direction a dimension roughly between 1 nanometre and 1 micrometre, or that in a system discontinuities are found at distances of that order. It is not necessary for all three dimensions to be in the colloidal range…Nor is it necessary for the units of a colloidal system to be discrete…The size limits given above are not rigid since they will depend to some extent on the properties under consideration.

This IUPAC definition is particularly important because it highlights the flexibility inherent in colloidal systems. However, much of the confusion surrounding colloids arises from oversimplifications. IUPAC makes it clear that exceptions exist, and the definition should not be viewed as a rigid rule. D.H. Everett—the scientist who wrote the IUPAC definition—emphasized that colloids are often better understood through examples rather than strict definitions.

== Classification ==
Colloids can be classified as follows:

		Dispersed phase		
		Gas	Liquid	Solid
Dispersion medium	Gas	No such colloids are known Helium and xenon are known to be immiscible under certain conditions.	Liquid aerosol Examples: fog, clouds, condensation, mist, steam, hair sprays	Solid aerosol Examples: smoke, ice cloud, atmospheric particulate matter
Dispersion medium	Liquid	Foam Examples: whipped cream, shaving cream	Emulsion or Liquid crystal Examples: milk, mayonnaise, hand cream, latex, biological membranes, liquid biomolecular condensate	Sol Examples: pigmented ink, sediment, mud, precipitates, solid biomolecular condensate
Dispersion medium	Solid	Solid foam Examples: aerogel, floating soap, styrofoam, pumice	Gel Examples: agar, gelatin, jelly, gel-like biomolecular condensate	Solid sol Example: cranberry glass

Homogeneous mixtures with a dispersed phase in this size range may be called colloidal aerosols, colloidal emulsions, colloidal suspensions, colloidal foams, colloidal dispersions, or hydrosols.

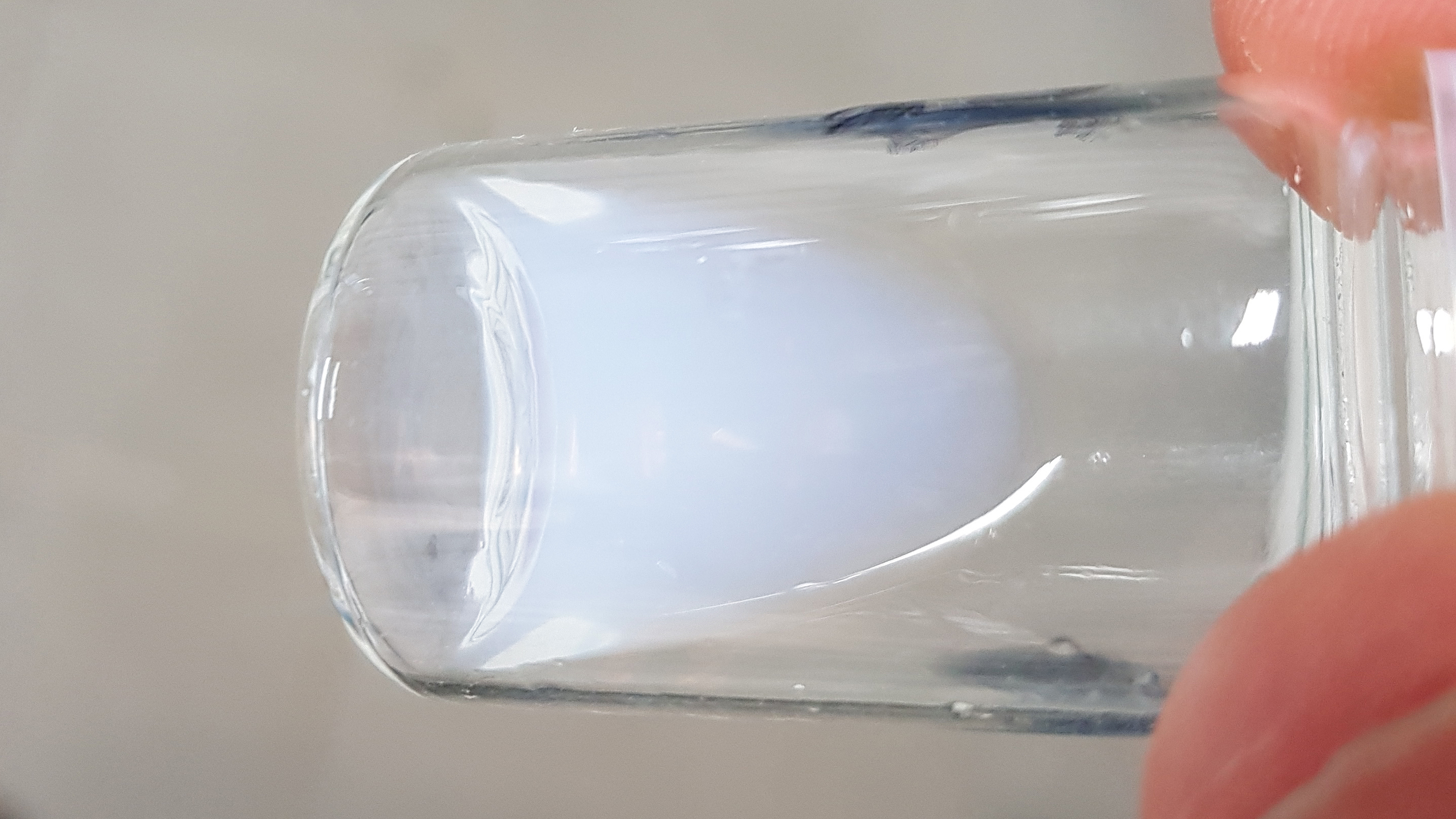
Colloidal silica gel with light opalescence

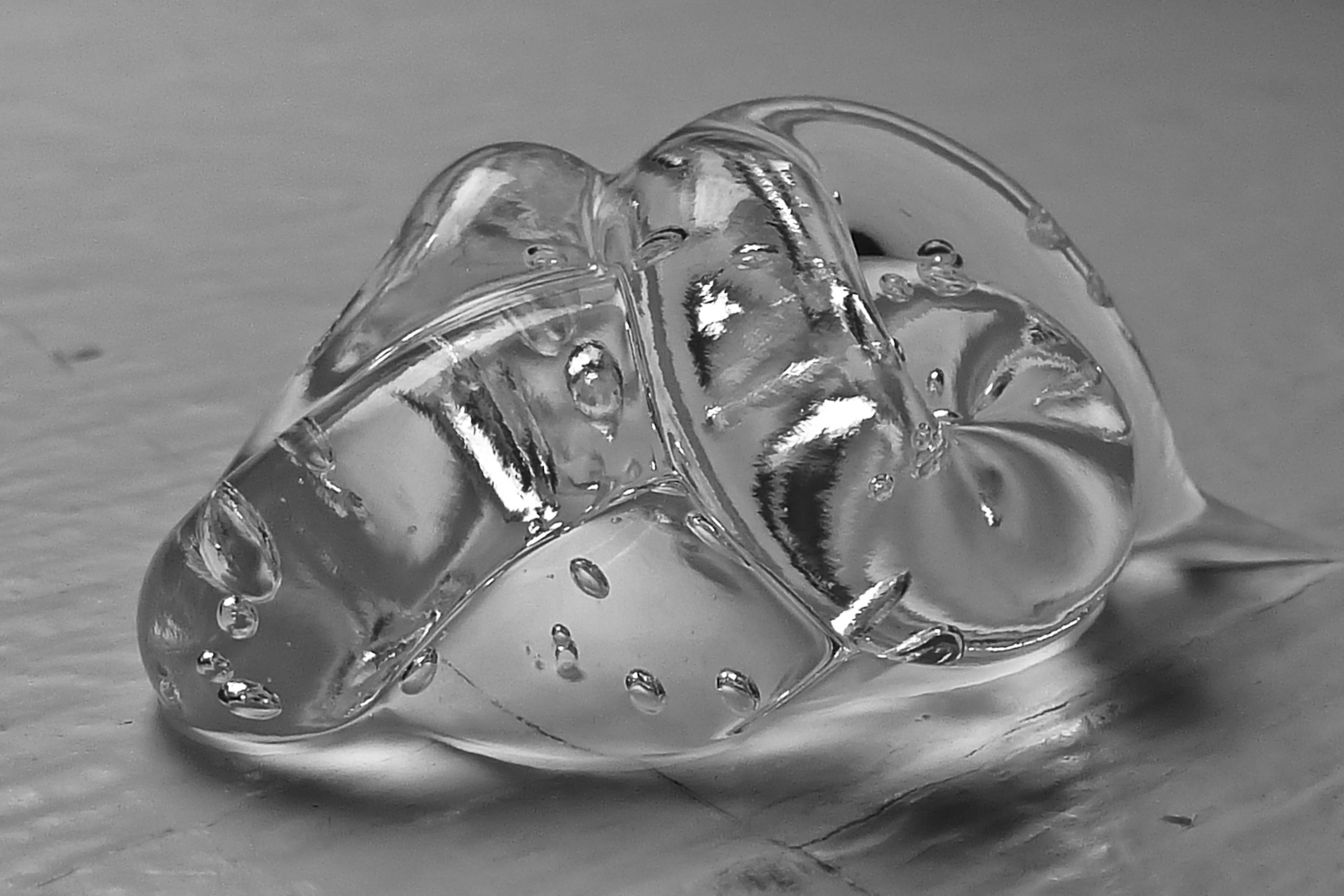
A dollop of hair gel

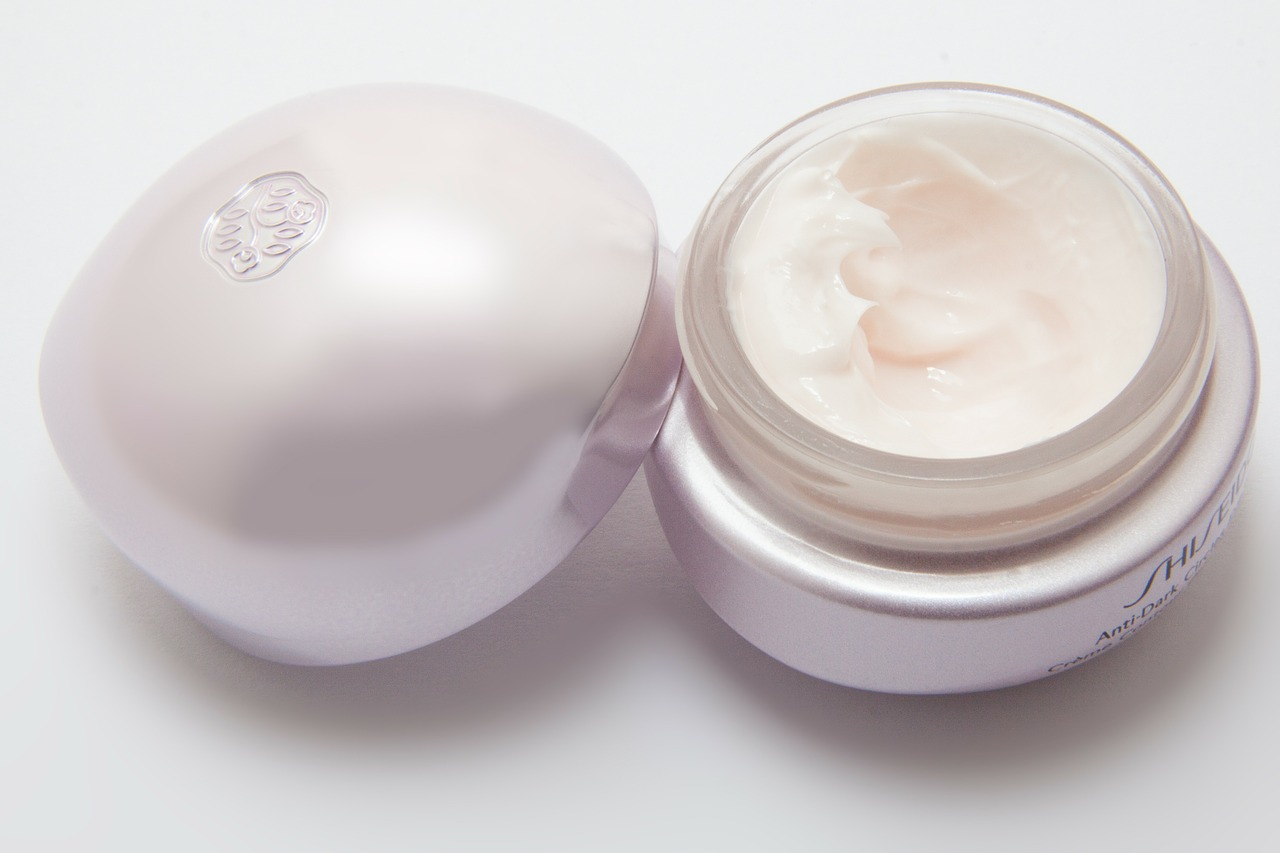
Creams are semi-solid emulsions of oil and water. Oil-in-water creams are used for cosmetic purpose while water-in-oil creams for medicinal purpose

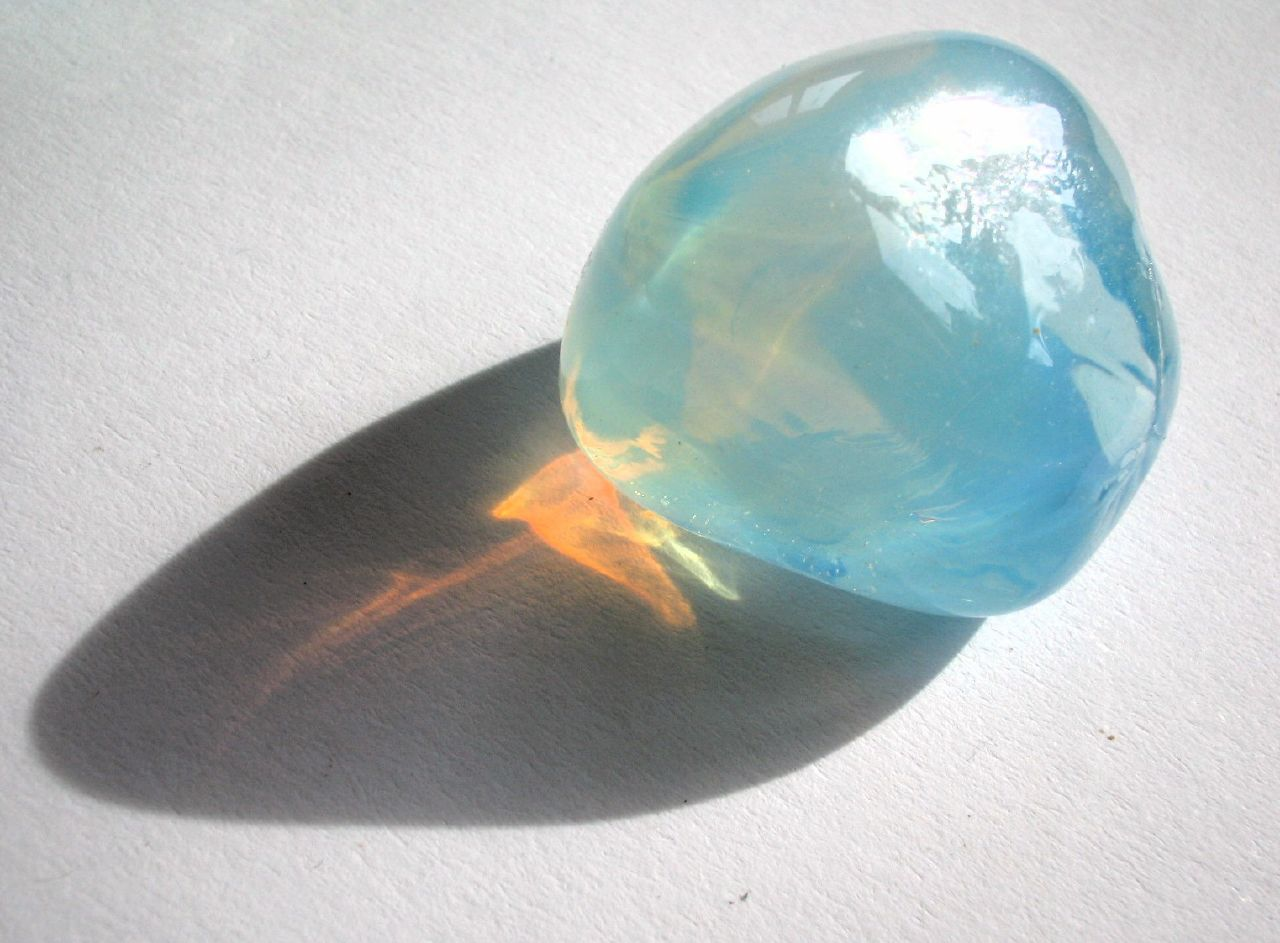
Tyndall effect in an opalite:
it scatters blue light making it appear blue from the side, but orange light shines through.
Opal is a gel in which water is dispersed in silica crystals.

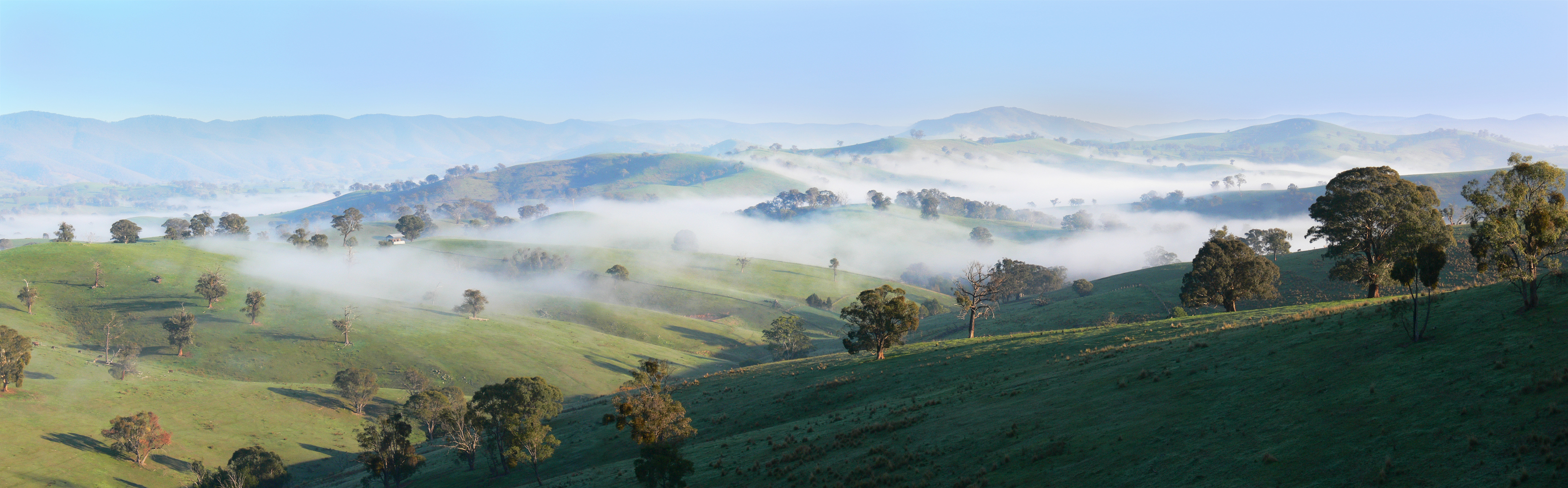
Mist

== Hydrocolloids ==
Hydrocolloids describe certain chemicals (mostly polysaccharides and proteins) that are colloidally dispersible in water. Thus becoming effectively "soluble", they change the rheology of water by raising the viscosity and/or inducing gelation. They may provide other interactive effects with other chemicals, in some cases synergistic, in others antagonistic. Using these attributes, hydrocolloids are very useful chemicals since in many areas of technology – from foods through pharmaceuticals and personal-care products, to industrial applications – they can provide stabilization, destabilization and separation, gelation, flow control, crystallization control, and numerous other effects. Apart from uses of the soluble forms, some of hydrocolloids have additional functionality in a dry form if, after solubilization, they have the water removed – as in the formation breath-strip films, artificial sausage casings, and wound-dressing fibers (some being more compatible with skin than others). There are many different types of hydrocolloids, each with differences in structure, function, and utility; which is best suited to a particular application area may depend on the control of rheology and the physical modification of form and texture. Some hydrocolloids like corn starch and casein are useful foods, as well as rheology modifiers; others have some limited nutritional value, usually providing a source of dietary fiber.

The term hydrocolloid may also refer to a type of wound dressing, designed to lock moisture in the skin and help the natural healing process of skin, to reduce scarring, itching, and soreness.

=== Components ===
Hydrocolloids contain some type of gel-forming agent, such as sodium carboxymethyl cellulose (NaCMC or CMC) or gelatin. They are normally combined with some type of sealant, like polyurethane, to stick to skin.

== Compared with solution ==
A colloid has a dispersed phase and a continuous phase, whereas in a solution, the solute and solvent constitute only one phase. A solute in a solution are individual molecules or ions, whereas colloidal particles are bigger. For example, in a solution of salt in water, the sodium chloride (NaCl) crystal dissolves, and the Na^{+} and Cl^{−} ions are surrounded by water molecules. However, in a colloid such as milk, the colloidal particles are globules of fat, rather than individual fat molecules. Because colloid is multiple phases, it has very different properties compared to fully mixed, continuous solution.

== Interaction between particles ==
The following forces play an important role in the interaction of colloid particles:

- Excluded volume repulsion: This refers to the impossibility of any overlap between hard particles.
- Electrostatic interaction: Colloidal particles often carry an electrical charge and therefore attract or repel each other. The charge of both the continuous and the dispersed phase, as well as the mobility of the phases are factors affecting this interaction.
- van der Waals forces: This is due to interaction between two dipoles that are either permanent or induced. Even if the particles do not have a permanent dipole, fluctuations of the electron density gives rise to a temporary dipole in a particle. This temporary dipole induces a dipole in particles nearby. The temporary dipole and the induced dipoles are then attracted to each other. This is known as van der Waals force, and is always present (unless the refractive indexes of the dispersed and continuous phases are matched), is short-range, and is attractive.
- Steric forces: A repulsive steric force typically occurring due to adsorbed polymers coating a colloid's surface.
- Depletion forces: An attractive entropic force arising from an osmotic pressure imbalance when colloids are suspended in a medium of much smaller particles or polymers called depletants.

== Sedimentation velocity ==
Brownian motion of 350 nm diameter polymer colloidal particles.

The Earth's gravitational field acts upon colloidal particles. Therefore, if the colloidal particles are denser than the medium of suspension, they will sediment (fall to the bottom), or if they are less dense, they will cream (float to the top). Larger particles also have a greater tendency to sediment because they have smaller Brownian motion to counteract this movement.

The sedimentation or creaming velocity is found by equating the Stokes drag force with the gravitational force:

$$m_Ag=6\pi \eta rv$$

where

$m_Ag$ is the Archimedean weight of the colloidal particles,

$\eta$ is the viscosity of the suspension medium,

$r$ is the radius of the colloidal particle,

and $v$ is the sedimentation or creaming velocity.

The mass of the colloidal particle is found using:

$$m_A =V(\rho_1 - \rho_2)$$

where

$V$ is the volume of the colloidal particle, calculated using the volume of a sphere $V = \frac{4}{3}\pi r^3$,

and $\rho_1-\rho_2$ is the difference in mass density between the colloidal particle and the suspension medium.

By rearranging, the sedimentation or creaming velocity is:

$$v = \frac{m_Ag}{6\pi\eta r}$$

There is an upper limit on the diameter of colloidal particles, because particles larger than 1 μm tend to sediment; thus, the substance would no longer be considered a colloidal suspension.

The colloidal particles are said to be in sedimentation equilibrium, if the rate of sedimentation is equal to the rate of movement from Brownian motion.

== Preparation ==
There are two principal ways to prepare colloids:

- Dispersion of large particles or droplets to the colloidal dimensions by milling, spraying, or application of shear (e.g., shaking, mixing, or high shear mixing).
- Condensation of small dissolved molecules into larger colloidal particles by precipitation, condensation, or redox reactions. Such processes are used in the preparation of colloidal silica or gold.

=== Stabilization ===
The stability of a colloidal system is defined by particles remaining suspended in solution and depends on the interaction forces between the particles. These include electrostatic interactions and van der Waals forces, because they both contribute to the overall free energy of the system.

A colloid is stable if the interaction energy due to attractive forces between the colloidal particles is less than kT, where k is the Boltzmann constant and T is the absolute temperature. If this is the case, then the colloidal particles will repel or only weakly attract each other, and the substance will remain a suspension.

If the interaction energy is greater than kT, the attractive forces will prevail, and the colloidal particles will begin to clump together. This process is referred to generally as aggregation, but is also referred to as flocculation, coagulation or precipitation. While these terms are often used interchangeably, for some definitions they have slightly different meanings. For example, coagulation can be used to describe irreversible, permanent aggregation where the forces holding the particles together are stronger than any external forces caused by stirring or mixing. Flocculation can be used to describe reversible aggregation involving weaker attractive forces, and the aggregate is usually called a floc. The term precipitation is normally reserved for describing a phase change from a colloid dispersion to a solid (precipitate) when it is subjected to a perturbation. Aggregation causes sedimentation or creaming, therefore the colloid is unstable: if either of these processes occur the colloid will no longer be a suspension.

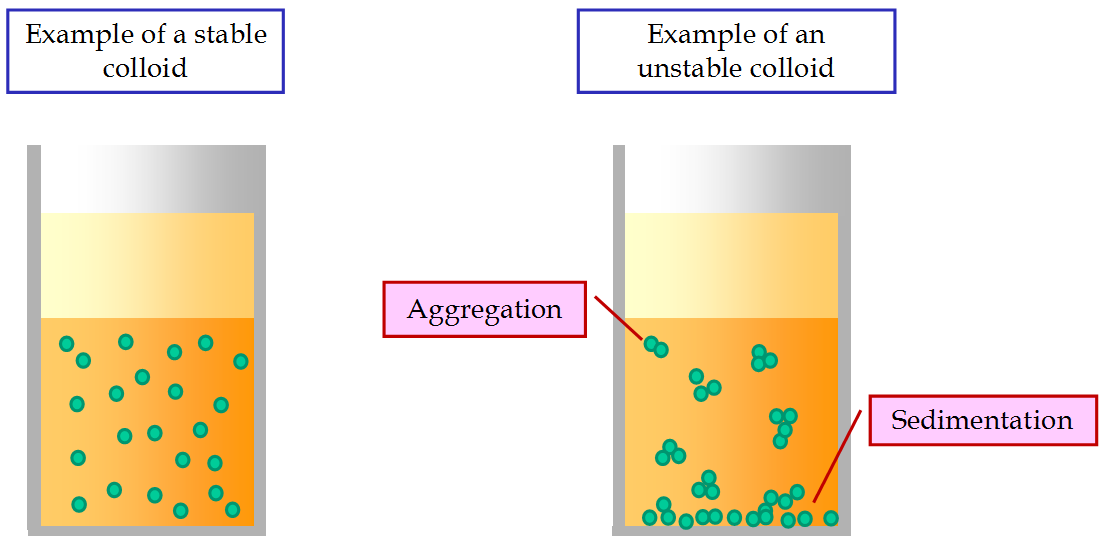
Examples of a stable and of an unstable colloidal dispersion.

Electrostatic stabilization and steric stabilization are the two main mechanisms for stabilization against aggregation.

- Electrostatic stabilization is based on the mutual repulsion of like electrical charges. The charge of colloidal particles is structured in an electrical double layer, where the particles are charged on the surface, but then attract counterions (ions of opposite charge) which surround the particle. The electrostatic repulsion between suspended colloidal particles is most readily quantified in terms of the zeta potential. The combined effect of van der Waals attraction and electrostatic repulsion on aggregation is described quantitatively by the DLVO theory. A common method of stabilising a colloid (converting it from a precipitate) is peptization, a process where it is shaken with an electrolyte.
- Steric stabilization consists absorbing a layer of a polymer or surfactant on the particles to prevent them from getting close in the range of attractive forces. The polymer consists of chains that are attached to the particle surface, and the part of the chain that extends out is soluble in the suspension medium. This technique is used to stabilize colloidal particles in all types of solvents, including organic solvents.

A combination of the two mechanisms is also possible (electrosteric stabilization).

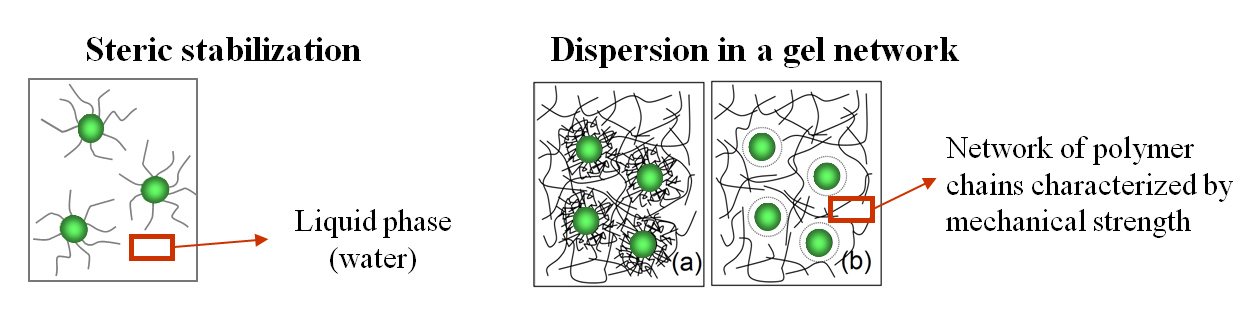
Steric and gel network stabilization.

A method called gel network stabilization represents the principal way to produce colloids stable to both aggregation and sedimentation. The method consists in adding to the colloidal suspension a polymer able to form a gel network. Particle settling is hindered by the stiffness of the polymeric matrix where particles are trapped, and the long polymeric chains can provide a steric or electrosteric stabilization to dispersed particles. Examples of such substances are xanthan and guar gum.

=== Destabilization ===
Destabilization can be accomplished by different methods:

- Removal of the electrostatic barrier that prevents aggregation of the particles. This can be accomplished by the addition of salt to a suspension to reduce the Debye screening length (the width of the electrical double layer) of the particles. It is also accomplished by changing the pH of a suspension to effectively neutralise the surface charge of the particles in suspension. This removes the repulsive forces that keep colloidal particles separate and allows for aggregation due to van der Waals forces. Minor changes in pH can manifest in significant alteration to the zeta potential. When the magnitude of the zeta potential lies below a certain threshold, typically around ± 5mV, rapid coagulation or aggregation tends to occur.
- Addition of a charged polymer flocculant. Polymer flocculants can bridge individual colloidal particles by attractive electrostatic interactions. For example, negatively charged colloidal silica or clay particles can be flocculated by the addition of a positively charged polymer.
- Addition of non-adsorbed polymers called depletants that cause aggregation due to entropic effects.

Unstable colloidal suspensions of low-volume fraction form clustered liquid suspensions, wherein individual clusters of particles sediment if they are more dense than the suspension medium, or cream if they are less dense. However, colloidal suspensions of higher-volume fraction form colloidal gels with viscoelastic properties. Viscoelastic colloidal gels, such as bentonite and toothpaste, flow like liquids under shear, but maintain their shape when shear is removed. It is for this reason that toothpaste can be squeezed from a toothpaste tube, but stays on the toothbrush after it is applied.

=== Monitoring stability ===
Measurement principle of multiple light scattering coupled with vertical scanning

The most widely used technique to monitor the dispersion state of a product, and to identify and quantify destabilization phenomena, is multiple light scattering coupled with vertical scanning. This method, known as turbidimetry, is based on measuring the fraction of light that, after being sent through the sample, is backscattered by the colloidal particles. The backscattering intensity is directly proportional to the average particle size and volume fraction of the dispersed phase. Therefore, local changes in concentration caused by sedimentation or creaming, and clumping together of particles caused by aggregation, are detected and monitored. These phenomena are associated with unstable colloids.

Dynamic light scattering can be used to detect the size of a colloidal particle by measuring how fast they diffuse. This method involves directing laser light towards a colloid. The scattered light will form an interference pattern, and the fluctuation in light intensity in this pattern is caused by the Brownian motion of the particles. If the apparent size of the particles increases due to them clumping together via aggregation, it will result in slower Brownian motion. This technique can confirm that aggregation has occurred if the apparent particle size is determined to be beyond the typical size range for colloidal particles.

=== Accelerating methods for shelf life prediction ===
The kinetic process of destabilisation can be rather long (up to several months or years for some products). Thus, further accelerating methods are often required, to enable the formulator to develop a new product design within a reasonable timeframe. Thermal methods are the most commonly used and consist of increasing temperature to accelerate destabilisation (below critical temperatures of phase inversion or chemical degradation). Temperature affects not only viscosity, but also interfacial tension in the case of non-ionic surfactants or more generally interactions forces inside the system. Storing a dispersion at high temperatures makes it possible to simulate real-life conditions for a product (e.g. tube of sunscreen cream in a car in the summer), but also to accelerate destabilisation processes up to 200 times. Mechanical acceleration including vibration, centrifugation and agitation are sometimes used. They subject the product to different forces that pushes the particles / droplets against one another, hence helping in the film drainage. Some emulsions would never coalesce in normal gravity, while they do under artificial gravity. Segregation of different populations of particles have been highlighted when using centrifugation and vibration.

== As a model system for atoms ==
In physics, colloids are an interesting model system for atoms. Micrometre-scale colloidal particles are large enough to be observed by optical techniques such as confocal microscopy. Many of the forces that govern the structure and behavior of matter, such as excluded volume interactions or electrostatic forces, govern the structure and behavior of colloidal suspensions. For example, the same techniques used to model ideal gases can be applied to model the behavior of a hard sphere colloidal suspension. Phase transitions in colloidal suspensions can be studied in real time using optical techniques, and are analogous to phase transitions in liquids. In many interesting cases optical fluidity is used to control colloid suspensions.

Colloids are also used as model systems for studying the glass transition, because dense colloidal suspensions can display glassy dynamics similar to those of glass-forming liquids. Molecular-dynamics simulations of anisotropic ellipsoidal particles interacting through the Gay–Berne potential have reported liquid-glass behavior related to experiments on ellipsoidal PMMA colloids, where rotational motion becomes arrested while translational motion remains fluid-like.

== Crystals ==
A colloidal crystal is a highly ordered array of particles that can be formed over a very long range (typically on the order of a few millimeters to one centimeter) and that appear analogous to their atomic or molecular counterparts. One of the finest natural examples of this ordering phenomenon can be found in precious opal, in which brilliant regions of pure spectral color result from close-packed domains of amorphous colloidal spheres of silicon dioxide (or silica, SiO_{2}). These spherical particles precipitate in highly siliceous pools in Australia and elsewhere, and form these highly ordered arrays after years of sedimentation and compression under hydrostatic and gravitational forces. The periodic arrays of submicrometre spherical particles provide similar arrays of interstitial voids, which act as a natural diffraction grating for visible light waves, particularly when the interstitial spacing is of the same order of magnitude as the incident lightwave.

Thus, it has been known for many years that, due to repulsive Coulombic interactions, electrically charged macromolecules in an aqueous environment can exhibit long-range crystal-like correlations with interparticle separation distances, often being considerably greater than the individual particle diameter. In all of these cases in nature, the same brilliant iridescence (or play of colors) can be attributed to the diffraction and constructive interference of visible lightwaves that satisfy Bragg's law, in a matter analogous to the scattering of X-rays in crystalline solids.

The large number of experiments exploring the physics and chemistry of these so-called "colloidal crystals" has emerged as a result of the relatively simple methods that have evolved in the last 20 years for preparing synthetic monodisperse colloids (both polymer and mineral) and, through various mechanisms, implementing and preserving their long-range order formation.

== In biology ==
Colloidal phase separation is an important organising principle for compartmentalisation of both the cytoplasm and nucleus of cells into biomolecular condensates—similar in importance to compartmentalisation via lipid bilayer membranes, a type of liquid crystal. The term biomolecular condensate has been used to refer to clusters of macromolecules that arise via liquid-liquid or liquid-solid phase separation within cells. Macromolecular crowding strongly enhances colloidal phase separation and formation of biomolecular condensates. Colloidal solutions are also used as a tool enabling fast, simple, and safe intracellular delivery of various types of molecules, such as polymers or proteins.

== In the environment ==
Colloidal particles can also serve as transport vectors of diverse contaminants in the surface water (sea water, lakes, rivers, freshwater bodies) and in underground water circulating in fissured rocks (e.g. limestone, sandstone, granite). Radionuclides and heavy metals easily sorb onto colloids suspended in water. Various types of colloids are recognised: inorganic colloids (e.g. clay particles, silicates, iron oxy-hydroxides), organic colloids (humic and fulvic substances). When heavy metals or radionuclides form pure colloids, the term "eigencolloid" is used to designate pure phases, i.e., pure Tc(OH)_{4}, U(OH)_{4}, or Am(OH)_{3}. Colloids have been suspected for the long-range transport of plutonium on the Nevada Nuclear Test Site. They have been the subject of detailed studies for many years. However, the mobility of inorganic colloids is very low in compacted bentonites and in deep clay formations because of the process of ultrafiltration occurring in dense clay membrane. The question is less clear for small organic colloids often mixed in porewater with truly dissolved organic molecules.

In soil science, the colloidal fraction in soils consists of tiny clay and humus particles that are less than 1μm in diameter and carry either positive and/or negative electrostatic charges that vary depending on the chemical conditions of the soil sample, i.e. soil pH.

== Intravenous therapy ==
Colloid solutions used in intravenous therapy belong to a major group of volume expanders, and can be used for intravenous fluid replacement. Colloids preserve a high colloid osmotic pressure in the blood, and therefore, they should theoretically preferentially increase the intravascular volume, whereas other types of volume expanders called crystalloids also increase the interstitial volume and intracellular volume. However, there is still controversy to the actual difference in efficacy by this difference, and much of the research related to this use of colloids is based on fraudulent research by Joachim Boldt. Another difference is that crystalloids generally are much cheaper than colloids.
