= Emulsion stabilization using polyelectrolytes =

Class of chemicals and interactions

Polyelectrolytes are charged polymers capable of stabilizing (or destabilizing) colloidal emulsions through electrostatic interactions. Their effectiveness can be dependent on molecular weight, pH, solvent polarity, ionic strength, and the hydrophilic-lipophilic balance (HLB). Stabilized emulsions are useful in many industrial processes, including deflocculation, drug delivery, petroleum waste treatment, and food technology.

== Types of polyelectrolytes ==
Polyelectrolytes are made up of positively or negatively charged repeat units. The charge on a polyelectrolyte depends on the different properties of the solution, such as the degree of dissociation of the monomer units, the solvent properties, salt concentration, pH, and temperature.

Polymers become charged through the dissociation of the monomer side groups. If more monomer side groups are dissociated, the polymer has a higher charge. In turn, the charge of the polymer classifies the polyelectrolyte, which can be positive (cationic) or negative (anionic).

The polymer charge and ionic strength of the polyelectrolyte in question dictate how thick a polyelectrolyte layer will be. The thickness of a polyelectrolyte then affects its adsorption ability. For more information on polyelectrolyte adsorption, look here.

Some examples of polyelectrolytes can be found in the table below. The properties of the polymers vary with molecular weight and degree of polymerization.

Polyelectrolyte and type	Pk_{a} of monomer unit (in water)	Molar mass (g/mol)	Degree of polymerization	Structure
PSS (anionic)	-0.53	70,000	340	
PAA (anionic)	4.35	10,000	140	
APMA (cationic)	5.0	131,000	1528	
PEA (cationic)	1.2	3600	36	
Poly-L-arginine (cationic)	9.0	15,000-70,000	96-450	

== Types of emulsions ==
The two main types of emulsions are oil-in-water (nonpolar in polar) and water-in-oil (polar in nonpolar). The difference depends upon the nature of the surfactant or polyelectrolyte in question. The hydrophilic pieces will attract the polar solvent, creating a water-in-oil emulsion and the hydrophobic pieces will attract the nonpolar solvent, creating an oil-in-water emulsion.

== Emulsion stability ==
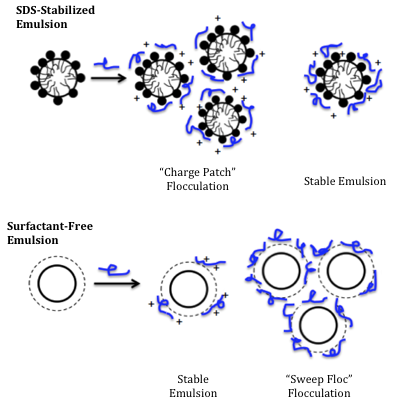
Schematic representation of flocculation mechanism in SDS-stabilized (top) and surfactant-free (bottom) emulsions

When there is less interfacial tension between the polyelectrolyte particles and the emulsions in question, emulsions are less stable. This is because the polyelectrolyte particles penetrate the flocs in suspension less when there is less interfacial tension.

Polyelectrolytes adsorb to the interface the emulsion and help stabilize it, but may or may not lower the interfacial tension. This means that the oil or water droplets will not coalesce.

On their own, hydrophobic surfactants cannot stabilize an emulsion. Although they are attracted to oil, and an oil-in-water emulsion forms, the emulsion will not stay stable for long and will eventually coalesce. With the addition of a polyelectrolyte, electrostatic forces between the oil and water interface are formed and the surfactant begins to act as an "anchor" for the polyelectrolyte, stabilizing the emulsion. In addition to surfactants, nanoparticles can also help stabilize the emulsion by also providing a charged interface for the polyelectrolyte to adsorb on.

=== Molecular weight effects ===
The stability of the emulsion can depend on the molecular weight of the accompanying polyelectrolyte. Polyelectrolytes of a high molecular weight are the most effective at stabilization. This is because they form a substantial steric barrier between oil and water, inhibiting aggregation. However, if the polyelectrolyte is too heavy it will not dissolve in the solution. Instead it will form gel lumps and fail to stabilize the emulsion.

=== pH effects ===
The effect of pH on the stability of polyelectrolytes is based upon the functional group on the polymer backbone that is bearing the charge. A protonated amine, for instance, will be much more stable at a lower pH while a sulfonate group will be more stable at a higher pH.

=== Solvent effects ===
Polyelectrolytes will be much more soluble in polar solvents due to the charge on the polymer backbone and will spread out more. In nonpolar solvents, polyelectrolytes will coil becoming more densely packed and, if the backbone is nonpolar, will put the charge on the inside of the packed structure.

=== Ionic strength ===
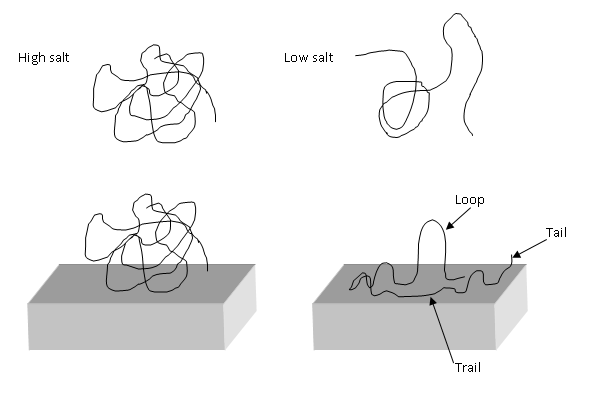
The effects of salt concentration on polyelectrolytes structure

Ionic strength plays a crucial role in stability. In water-in-oil emulsions, as well as many others, the dielectric constant of the solvent is so low that the electrostatic forces between particles are not strong enough to have an effect on emulsion stability. Thus, emulsion stability depends greatly on the polyelectrolyte film thickness.

The polyelectrolyte film thickness is dependent upon its ionic strength. charged species on polyelectrolyte chains repel each other, causing the chains to stretch out. As the salt concentration increases, ionic strength increases, and the ions will shield the charges on the polymer chain allowing the polymer chain to form a dense random coil.

== Theory ==
=== Electrostatic stabilization ===
Electrostatic repulsive forces dominate in polyelectrolyte stabilized emulsions., Although there are steric interactions, they are negligible in comparison. As the concentration of polyelectrolyte increases, repulsive forces increase. When there are more polyelectrolyte molecules, the distance between individual particles decreases. As the distance $h$ decreases, the exponential term becomes greater. Consequently, the repulsion energy also increases.

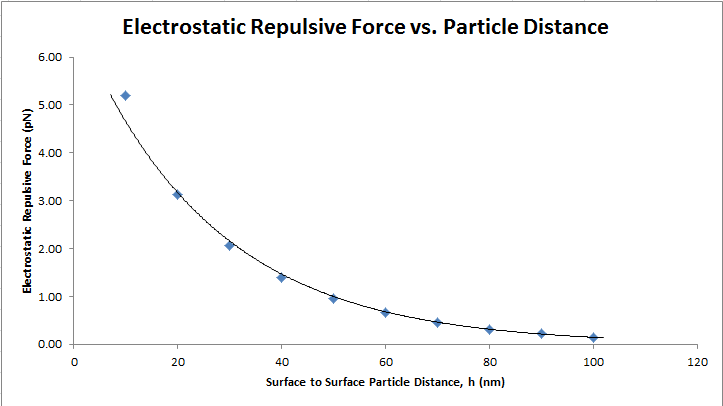
This graph illustrates eq. 1. It can be seen that as the surface to surface particle distance decreases, the electrostatic repulsive force decreases exponentially.

The general equation for repulsion energy assuming spherical particles (eq. 1):

$$V = \frac{64\pi RC k_\text{B} T \Gamma e^{-Kh}}{K^2},$$

where

$R$ = particle radius,
$C$ = bulk concentration of ions.
$k_\text{B}$ = Boltzmann constant,
$\Gamma$ = reduced surface potential.
$h$ = the surface to surface distance of the spherical particles.
$T$ = the thermodynamic temperature
$K$ = the Debye length.

In addition, pH and ionic strength have a great influence on electrostatic interactions because these affect the "magnitude of electrical charge" in solution. As can be seen from the above equation, the repulsion energy depends on the square of the Debye length. From the equation for the Debye length, it is demonstrated how ionic strength can ultimately affect the electrostatic interactions in a solution.

=== Bjerrum length ===
Naturally, the question of the distance at which these electrostatic interactions become important arises. This can be discussed using the Bjerrum length. The Bjerrum length is the distance at which the electrostatic interaction between two charges is comparable to the thermal energy, $k_\text{B} T$. The distance is given by eq. 2:

$$\lambda_B = \frac{e^2}{4\pi \varepsilon_r\varepsilon_0 k_\text{B} T},$$

where

$e$ = elementary charge,
$\varepsilon_0$ = vacuum permittivity,
$\varepsilon_r$ = relative dielectric constant.

=== Surface charge density ===
The factors discussed above can influence the charge on the surface of the polyelectrolyte. The surface charge density of these surfaces, at low surface potentials, can be modeled using a simplified version of the Grahame equation (eq. 3):

$\sigma={\varepsilon_r\varepsilon_0\phi_0}{K},$

where

$\phi_0$ = surface potential.

Examples of polymers and their surface charge densities can be found in the table below.

Polymer	Surface charge density $(\frac{C}{m^2})$	Structure
Latex	−0.06	
Pectin	-0.011	
PAA (0.1% dwb in ZrO_{2})	-0.088	

== Applications ==
=== Deflocculation ===
Depending on the situation, polyelectrolytes can function as either flocculants or deflocculants. To stabilize emulsion, deflocculant polyelectrolytes are required. When repulsive forces between particles overcome the intermolecular forces in solution and the loose flocculated aggregates separate, deflocculation occurs. As opposed to the loose and easily separated sediments formed in flocculation, sediments formed in deflocculation are tightly packed and difficult to redisperse. The repelling forces in a deflocculation increase the zeta potential, which in turn reduces the viscosity of the suspension. Because of this reduction in viscosity, deflocculants are sometimes referred to as "thinning agents". These thinning agents are usually alkaline and raise the pH of the suspension, preventing flocculation. Deflocculants are used as thinning agents in molding plastics, making glassware, and creating clay ceramics.

=== Petroleum waste treatment ===
Polyelectrolytes can also act as flocculants, separating solids (flakes) and liquids in industrial processes such as solubilization and oil recovery and they usually have a large cationic charge density.

Using organic materials to refine petroleum instead of iron or aluminum coagulated would greatly decrease that amount of inorganic waste produced. The waste consists of stable oil-in-water emulsions. The addition of various polyelectrolytes to petroleum waste can cause the oil to coagulate, which will make it easier to remove and dispose of, and does not significantly decrease the stability of the solution.

=== Drug delivery ===
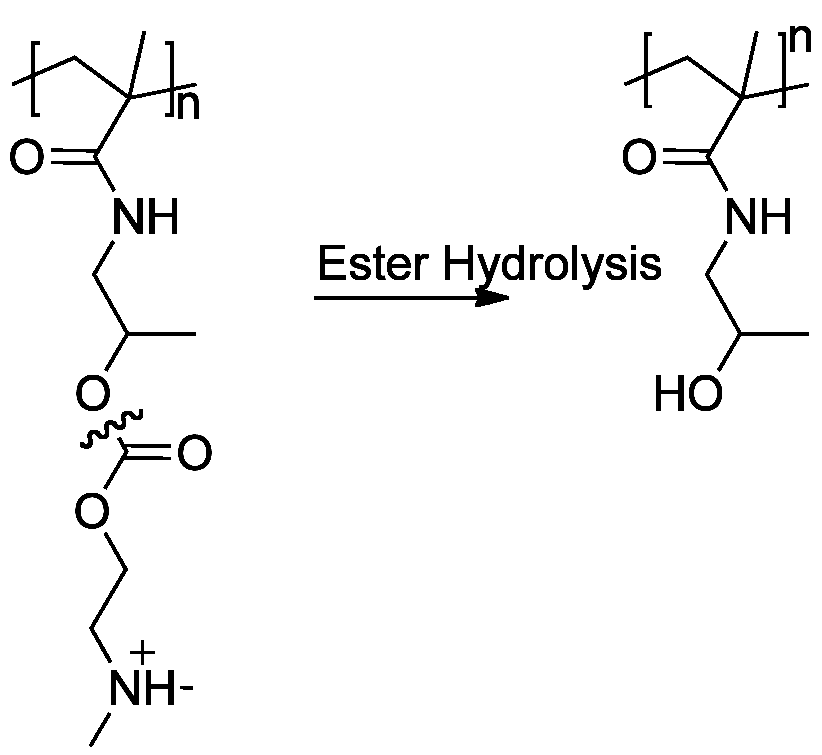
Hydrolysis of an ester bond on poly (HPMA-DMAE)

Polyelectrolyte stabilized emulsions are important in the field of nanomedicine. To function properly, any drug delivery system must be biocompatible and biodegradable. Polyelectrolytes such as dextran sulfate (DSS), protamine (PRM) or poly-L-arginine all fulfill these requirements and may be used as a capsule with an emulsion inside.

Oil in water emulsions are currently used as safe solvents for vaccines. It is important that these emulsion are stable and remain so for long periods of time. Polyelectrolyte stabilized emulsions could be used to increase the shelf life of vaccines. Researchers have been able to develop polyelectrolyte emulsions with more than six month stability.

In addition to being stable for extended periods of time, polyelectrolytes may be useful for vaccines because they can be biodegradable. For example, the ester bonds of the polyelectrolyte poly(HPMA-DMAE) can undergo hydrolysis in the human body and VERO cells envelope DSS and use poly-L-arginine to break them down. Once the polylelectroyte capsule has been degraded, the emulsion containing drug is released into the body. Researchers have been investigating this drug delivery method to target leukemia cells.

=== Food technology ===
Because polyelectrolytes may be biocompatible, it follows that they can be used to stabilize emulsion in foods. Several studies have focused on using polyelectrolytes to induce mixing of proteins and polysaccharides in oil-in-water emulsions. DSS has been successfully used to stabilize these types of emulsions. Other studies have focused on stabilizing oil-in-water emulsions using β-lactoglobulin (β-Lg), a globular protein, and pectin, an anionic polysaccharide. Both β-lactoglobulin and pectin are common ingredients in the food industry. β-lactoglobulin is used in whey protein, which can act as an emulsifier.

=== Cosmetics ===
Emulsion stabilisation is a major function of many cosmetic ingredients. This allows to improve emulsion stability and increase shelf life.
