= Clay–water interaction =

Various progressive interactions between clay minerals and water

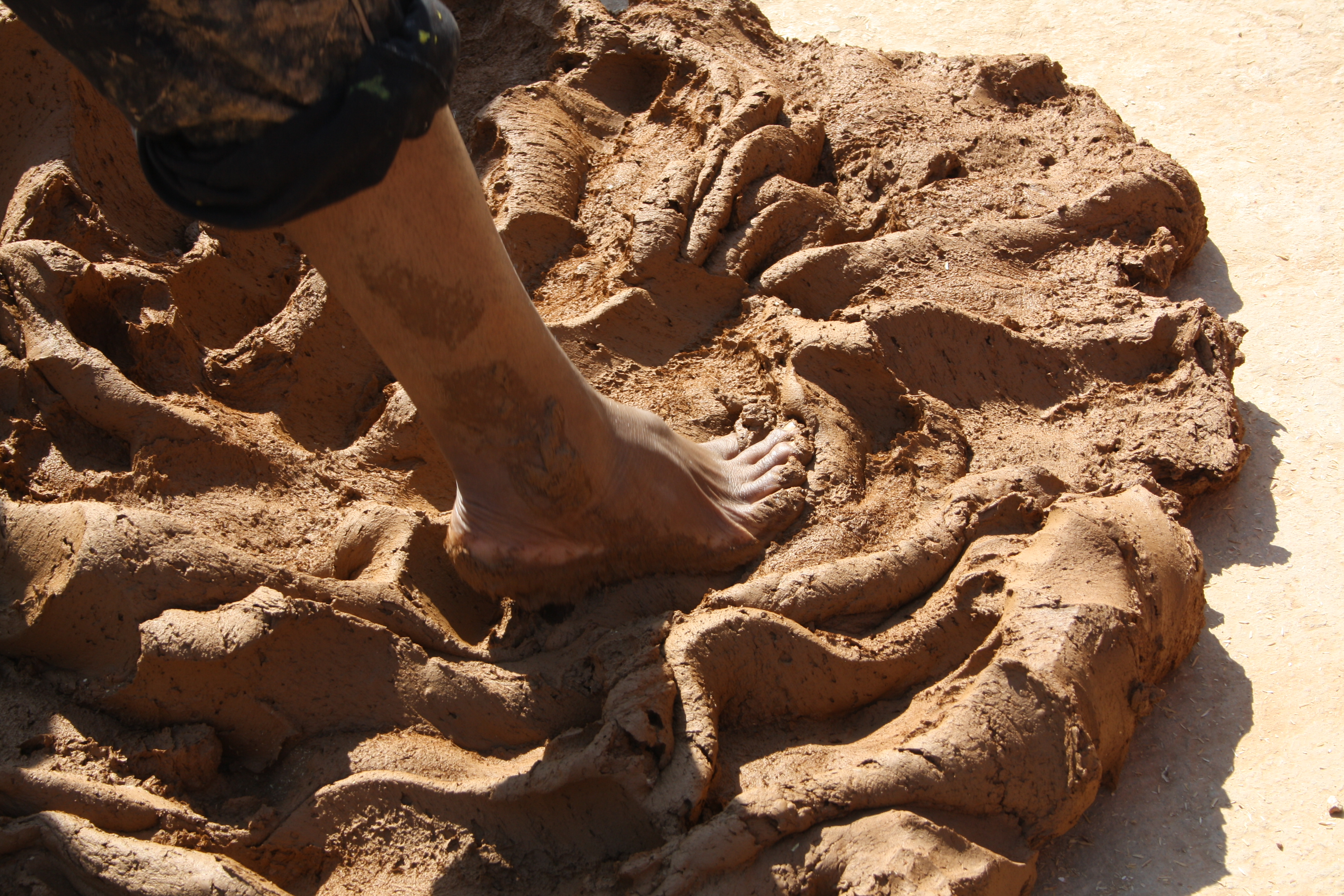
Reaction of clay in the presence of water

Clay-water interaction is an all-inclusive term to describe various progressive interactions between clay minerals and water. In the dry state, clay packets exist in face-to-face stacks like a deck of playing cards, but clay packets begin to change when exposed to water. Five descriptive terms describe the progressive interactions in a clay-water system.

(1) Hydration occurs as clay packets absorb water and swell.

(2) Dispersion (or disaggregation) causes clay platelets to break apart and disperse into the water due to the loss of attractive forces as water moves the platelets further apart.

(3) Flocculation begins when mechanical shearing stops, and platelets previously dispersed come together due to the attractive force of surface charges on the platelets.

(4) Deflocculation, or peptization, the opposite effect, occurs when a chemical de-flocculant is added to flocculated mud; the positive edge charges are covered, and attraction forces are greatly reduced.

(5) Aggregation, a result of ionic or thermal conditions, alters the hydrational layer around clay platelets, removes the deflocculant from positive edge charges, and allows platelets to assume a face-to-face structure.

== See also ==
- Dispersity
- Quick clay behaviour
