= Quaternium =

Quaternium may refer to:

- Polyquaternium
- Quaternium-15
- quaternary ammonium, functional group, cation, salt, compound
