= Dispersion stability =

Dispersions are unstable from the thermodynamic point of view; however, they can be kinetically stable over a large period of time, which determines their shelf life. This time span needs to be measured in order to ensure the best product quality to the final consumer. “Dispersion stability refers to the ability of a dispersion to resist change in its properties over time.” D.J. McClements.

== Destabilization phenomena of a dispersion ==
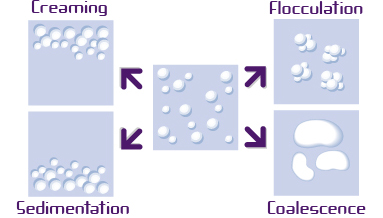
Major destabilization mechanisms for liquid dispersions

These destabilizations can be classified into two major processes:

1. Migration phenomena : whereby the difference in density between the continuous and dispersed phase, leads to gravitational phase separation:
  - Creaming, when the dispersed phase is less dense than the continuous phase (e.g. milk, cosmetic cream, soft drinks, etc.)
  - Sedimentation, when the dispersed phase is denser than the continuous phase (e.g. ink, CMP slurries, paint, etc.)
2. Particle size increase phenomena: whereby the size of the dispersed phase (drops, particles, bubbles) increases
  - reversibly (flocculation)
  - irreversibly (aggregation, coalescence, Ostwald ripening)

== Technique monitoring physical stability ==
Multiple light scattering coupled with vertical scanning is one of many techniques monitor the dispersion state of a product, identifying and quantifying destabilization phenomena. It works on concentrated dispersions without dilution. When light is sent through the sample, it is backscattered by the particles / droplets. The backscattering intensity is directly proportional to the size and volume fraction of the dispersed phase. Therefore, local changes in concentration (creaming and sedimentation) and global changes in size (flocculation, coalescence) are detected and monitored.

== Accelerating methods for shelf-life prediction ==
The kinetic process of destabilization can be rather long (up to several months or even years for some products) and it is often required for the formulator to use further accelerating methods in order to reach reasonable development time for new product design. Thermal methods are the most commonly used and consist in increasing temperature to accelerate destabilization (below critical temperatures of phase inversion or chemical degradation). Temperature affects not only the viscosity, but also interfacial tension in the case of non-ionic surfactants or more generally interaction forces inside the system. Storing a dispersion at high temperatures may accelerate some instability processes.

Mechanical acceleration, including vibration, centrifugation, and agitation, can also be used.
