= Colloidal probe technique =

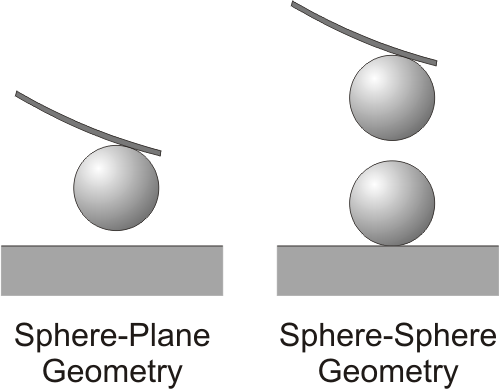
Scheme of the colloidal probe technique for direct force measurements in the sphere-plane and sphere-sphere geometries.

The colloidal probe technique is commonly used to measure interaction forces acting between colloidal particles and/or planar surfaces in air or in solution. This technique relies on the use of an atomic force microscope (AFM). However, instead of a cantilever with a sharp AFM tip, one uses the colloidal probe. The colloidal probe consists of a colloidal particle of few micrometers in diameter that is attached to an AFM cantilever. The colloidal probe technique can be used in the sphere-plane or sphere-sphere geometries (see figure). One typically achieves a force resolution between 1 and 100 pN and a distance resolution between 0.5 and 2 nm.

The colloidal probe technique has been developed in 1991 independently by Ducker and Butt. Since its development this tool has gained wide popularity in numerous research laboratories, and numerous reviews are available in the scientific literature.

Alternative techniques to measure force between surfaces involve the surface forces apparatus, total internal reflection microscopy, and optical tweezers techniques to with video microscopy.

== Purpose ==
The possibility to measure forces involving particles and surfaces directly is essential since such forces are relevant in a variety of processes involving colloidal and polymeric systems. Examples include particle aggregation, suspension rheology, particle deposition, and adhesion processes. One can equally study similar biological phenomena, such as deposition of bacteria or the infection of cells by viruses. Forces are equally most informative to investigate the mechanical properties of interfaces, bubbles, capsules, membranes, or cell walls. Such measurements permit to make conclusions about the elastic or plastic deformation or eventual rupture in such systems.

The colloidal probe technique provides a versatile tool to measure such forces between a colloidal particle and a planar substrate or between two colloidal particles (see figure above). The particles used in such experiments have typically a diameter between 1–10 μm. Typical applications involve measurements of electrical double layer forces and the corresponding surface potentials or surface charge, van der Waals forces, or forces induced by adsorbed polymers.

== Principle ==
The colloidal probe technique uses a standard AFM for the force measurements. But instead the AFM cantilever with an attached sharp tip one uses the colloidal probe. This colloidal probe is normally obtained by attaching a colloidal particle to a cantilever. By recording the deflection of the cantilever as a function of the vertical displacement of the AFM scanner one can extract the force acting between the probe and the surface as a function of the surface separation. This type of AFM operation is referred to as the force mode. With this probe, one can study interactions between various surfaces and probe particles in the sphere-plane geometry. It is also possible to study forces between colloidal particles by attaching another particle to the substrate and perform the measurement in the sphere-sphere geometry, see figure above.

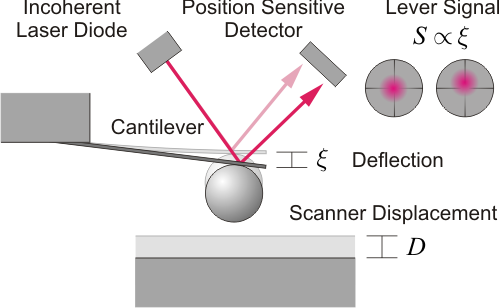
Principle of the force measurements by the colloidal probe technique. Illustration of the scanner displacement D, cantilever deflection ξ, and lever signal S.

The force mode used in the colloidal probe technique is illustrated in the figure on the left. The scanner is fabricated from piezoelectric crystals, which enable its positioning with a precision better than 0.1 nm. The scanner is lifted towards the probe and thereby one records the scanner displacement D. At the same time, the deflection of the cantilever ξ is monitored as well, typically with a comparable precision. One measures the deflection by focusing a light beam originating from a non-coherent laser diode to the back of the cantilever and detecting the reflected beam with a split photodiode. The lever signal S represents the difference in the photocurrents originating from the two halves of the diode. The lever signal is therefore proportional to the deflection ξ.

During an approach-retraction cycle, one records the lever signal S as a function of the vertical displacement D of the scanner. Suppose for the moment that the probe and the substrate are hard and non-deformable objects and that no forces are acting between them when they are not in contact. In such a situation, one refers to a hard-core repulsion. The cantilever will thus not deform as long not being in contact with the substrate. When the cantilever touches the substrate, its deflection will be the same as the displacement of the substrate. This response is referred to as the constant compliance or contact region. The lever signal S as a function of the scanner displacement D is shown in the figure below. This graph consists of two straight lines resembling a hockey-stick. When the surfaces are not in contact, the lever signal will be denoted as S_{0}. This value corresponds to the non-deformed lever. In the constant compliance region, the lever signal is simply a linear function of the displacement, and can be represented as a straight line

S = a D + b

The parameters a and b can be obtained from a least-squares fit of the constant compliance region. The inverse slope a^{−1} is also referred to as the optical lever sensitivity. By inverting this relation for the lever signal S_{0}, which corresponds to the non-deformed lever, one can accurately obtain the contact point from D_{0} = (S_{0} − b)/a. Depending on the substrate, the precision in determining this contact point is between 0.5–2 nm. In the constant compliance region, the lever deformation is given by

ξ = (S − S_{0})/a

In this fashion, one can detect deflections of the cantilever with typical resolution of better than 0.1 nm.

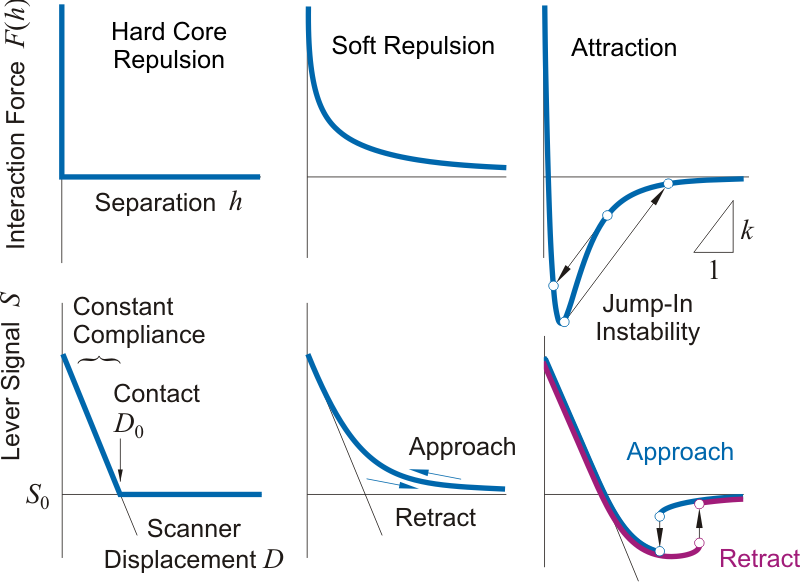
Response of the colloidal probe to different force profiles. The forces profiles are shown in top row, and the cantilever response in the bottom. From left to right: Hard-core repulsion, soft repulsion, and attraction.

Let us now consider the relevant situation where the probe and the substrate interact. Let us denote by F(h) the force between the probe and the substrate. This force depends on the surface separation h. In equilibrium, this force is compensated by the restoring force of the spring, which is given by the Hooke's law

F = k ξ

where k is the spring constant of the cantilever. Typical spring constants of AFM cantilevers are in the range of 0.1−10 N/m. Since the deflection is monitored with a precision better 0.1 nm, one typically obtains a force resolution of 1−100 pN. The separation distance can be obtained from the displacement of the scanner and the cantilever deflection

h = ξ + D − D_{0}

Figure below illustrates how the cantilever responds to different force profiles. In the case of a soft repulsive force, the cantilever is repelled from the surface and only slowly approaches the constant compliance region. In such situations, it might be actually difficult to identify this region correctly. When the force is attractive, the cantilever is attracted to the surface and may become unstable. From stability considerations one finds that the cantilever will be unstable provided

dF/dh > k

This instability is illustrated in the right panel of the figure on the right. As the cantilever approaches, the slope of the force curve increases. When the slope becomes larger than the spring constant of the cantilever, the cantilever jumps into contact when the slope of the force curve exceeds the force constant of the cantilever. Upon retraction, the same phenomenon happens, but the point where the cantilever jumps out is reached at a smaller separation. Upon approach and retraction, the system will show a hysteresis. In such situations, a part of the force profile cannot be probed. However, this problem can be avoided by using a stiffer cantilever, albeit at the expense of an inferior force resolution.

== Extensions ==
The colloidal probes are normally fabricated by gluing a colloidal particle to a tip-less cantilever with a micromanipulator in air. The subsequent rewetting of the probe may lead to the formation of nanosized bubbles on the probe surface. This problem can be avoided by attaching the colloidal particles under wet conditions in AFM fluid cell to appropriately functionalized cantilevers. While the colloidal probe technique is mostly used in the sphere-plane geometry, it can be also used in the sphere-sphere geometry. The latter geometry further requires a lateral centering of the two particles, which can be either achieved with an optical microscope or an AFM scan. The results obtained in these two different geometries can be related with the Derjaguin approximation.

The force measurements rely on an accurate value of the spring constant of the cantilever. This spring constant can be measured by different techniques. The thermal noise method is the simplest to use, as it is implemented on most AFMs. This approach relies on the determination of the mean square amplitude of the cantilever displacement due to spontaneous thermal fluctuations. This quantity is related to the spring constant by means of the equipartition theorem. In the added mass method one attaches a series of metal beads to the cantilever and each case one determines the resonance frequency. By exploiting the relation for a harmonic oscillator between the resonance frequency and the mass added one can evaluate the spring constant as well. The frictional force method relies on measurement of the approach and retract curves of the cantilever through a viscous fluid. Since the hydrodynamic drag of a sphere close to a planar substrate is known theoretically, the spring constant of the cantilever can be deduced. The geometrical method exploits relations between the geometry of the cantilever and its elastic properties.

The separation is normally measured from the onset of the constant compliance region. While the relative surface separation can be determined with a resolution of 0.1 nm or better, the absolute surface separation is obtained from the onset of the constant compliance region. While this onset can be determined for solid samples with a precision between 0.5–2 nm, the location of this onset can be problematic for soft repulsive interactions and for deformable surfaces. For this reason, techniques have been developed to measure the surface separation independently (e.g., total internal reflection microscopy, reflection interference contrast microscopy).

By scanning the sample with the colloidal probe laterally permits to exploit friction forces between the probe and the substrate. Since this technique exploits the torsion of the cantilever, to obtain quantitative data the torsional spring constant of the cantilever must be determined.

A related technique involving similar type of force measurements with the AFM is the single molecular force spectroscopy. However, this technique uses a regular AFM tip to which a single polymer molecule is attached. From the retraction part of the force curve, one can obtain information about stretching of the polymer or its peeling from the surface.

== See also ==
- Surface forces
