= Derjaguin =

Derjaguin may refer to:

- Boris Derjaguin (1902–1994), Russian chemist
  - Derjaguin approximation, expression of force profile interaction between finite size bodies
  - DLVO theory, force between charged surfaces interacting through a liquid medium
  - DMT model of elastic contact; see Contact mechanics
