= Polyquaternium-7 =

Names
- Other names: Poly(acrylamide-co-diallyldimethylammonium chloride); P(AAm-co-DADMAC); Quaternium-41; N,N-Dimethyl-N-2-propen-1-yl-2-propen-1-aminium chloride, polymer with 2-propenamide; Dimethyldiallyl ammonium chloride acrylamide copolymer

Identifiers
CAS Number	26590-05-6
PubChem CID	168563
UNII	0L414VCS5Y

Properties
Chemical formula	(C_{8}H_{16}ClN)_{n}(C_{3}H_{5}NO)_{m}
- Except where otherwise noted, data are given for materials in their standard state (at 25 °C [77 °F], 100 kPa). Infobox references

Polyquaternium-7 is an organic compound in the polyquaternium class of chemicals and used in the personal care industry. It is the copolymer of acrylamide and the quaternary ammonium salt diallyldimethylammonium chloride.

Its molecular formula is: (C_{8}H_{16}ClN)_{n}(C_{3}H_{5}NO)_{m}.

== Functions ==
Polyquaternium-7 is used for its antistatic and film forming properties. Also in cosmetic formulation.

== Usage ==
Polyquaternium 7 is the designation established with the original association, Cosmetics, Toiletries, and Fragrance Association (CTFA), now known as the Personal Care Products Council. There are an abundance of product names containing the same or a similar active ingredient for applications outside the cosmetics and personal care industry.

Polyquaternium-7 is applied in waste treatment for laundry, emulsion breaking, sludge dewatering and drainage and retention aid. It is a cationic polyelectrolyte.

Polyquaternium-7 is used as modifier, for example in shampoo, hair conditioner, hair spray, mousse, soap, gel, styling agent, shaving product, deodorant and antiperspirant. The DADMAC monomer is highly hydrophilic. Absorption of moisture from the air lends "conditioning" properties to the products that contain the copolymer such as shampoos, hair and skin conditioners and other personal care products including some bar soaps.

== Safety ==
According to its safety data sheet, it is not persistent, bioaccumulative, or toxic. Not a hazardous substance or mixture according to Regulation (EC) No. 1272/2008 or EC-directives 67/548/EEC or 1999/45/EC.

== Scientific studies ==
The influence of the synthetic cationic polymer polyquaternium-7 on the rheology and microstructure of creams was investigated.

Efficacy, mechanism and test methods of conditioning polymers in some shampoo formulations was investigated.
