= NBI Knowledgebase =

NBI is short for the Nanomaterial-Biological Interactions Knowledgebase at Oregon State University, a repository for annotated data on nanomaterials characterization (purity, size, shape, charge, composition, functionalization, agglomeration state), synthesis methods, and nanomaterial-biological interactions (beneficial, benign or deleterious) defined at multiple levels of biological organization (molecular, cellular, organismal). Computational and data mining tools are being developed and incorporated into the NBI to provide a logical framework for species, route, dose, and scenario extrapolations and to identify key data required to predict the biological interactions of nanomaterials.

Information currently being gained in the emerging field of nanotechnology is extremely diverse, including a multitude of widely varying nanomaterials that are being or will be tested in a broad array of animal systems and in vitro assays. Knowledge of nanomaterial-biological interactions will likely require inclusion and consideration of the entire body of data produced from global research efforts, which will allow the definition of nanomaterial structure-activity relationships. Such mathematical representations can be used to predict nanomaterial properties in the absence of empirical data.
