= PolyDADMAC =

Names
- Other names Poly(dimethyldiallylammonium chloride); Polyquaternium-6

Identifiers
CAS Number	26062-79-3
ChemSpider	None
ECHA InfoCard	100.130.940
EC Number	230-993-8
PubChem CID	33286
UNII	YFL33X52PX
CompTox Dashboard (EPA)	DTXSID1047237 DTXSID8035714, DTXSID1047237

Properties
Chemical formula	(C_{8}H_{16}NCl)_{n}
Molar mass	Variable
Solubility in water	Soluble

Hazards
- GHS labelling
Pictograms	(GHS09: Environmental hazard)
Signal word	Warning
Hazard statements	H410, H412
Precautionary statements	P273, P391, P501
- Except where otherwise noted, data are given for materials in their standard state (at 25 °C [77 °F], 100 kPa). verify (what is ?) Infobox references

Polydiallyldimethylammonium chloride (shortened polyDADMAC or polyDDA), also commonly polyquaternium-6, is a homopolymer of diallyldimethylammonium chloride (DADMAC). The molecular weight of polyDADMAC is typically in the range of hundreds of thousands of grams per mole, and even up to a million for some products. PolyDADMAC is usually delivered as a liquid concentrate having a solids level in the range of 10 to 50%. It is a high charge density cationic polymer. The charge density makes it well suited for flocculation. Actually, pDADMAC or DMDAAC, is used as a coagulant - a charge neutralization process that precedes flocculation.

== History ==
PolyDADMAC polymers were first prepared and studied in 1957 by Professor George Butler at the University of Florida. It was remarkable as it was soluble in water in contrast at the time to other known synthetic polymers formed by polymerization of monomers containing more than one vinyl functionality. The structure and reaction path was determined in 2002 with NMR studies. Much of what we know about pDADMAC in water treatment and personal care is from Jerry Boothe of Calgon Corporation.

== Synthesis ==
The monomer DADMAC is formed by reacting two equivalents of allyl chloride with dimethylamine. PolyDADMAC is then synthesized by radical polymerization of DADMAC with an organic peroxide used as a catalyst. Two polymeric structures are possible when polymerizing DADMAC: N-substituted piperidine structure or N-substituted pyrrolidine structure. The pyrrolidine structure is favored.

Polymerization of PolyDADMAC (shown as favoured pyrrolidine structure)

== Applications ==
=== Effluent treatment ===
PolyDADMAC is used in waste water treatment as a primary organic coagulant which neutralizes negatively charged colloidal material and reduces sludge volume compared with inorganic coagulants.

=== Pulp and paper industry ===
PolyDADMAC is used for controlling disturbing substances in the papermaking process. It provides superior fixing of pitch from mechanical pulp and of latex from coated broke. Used in the short circulation of a paper mill to enhance retention and dewatering. In addition, it can be used to improve the efficiency of disk filters and flotators, and for cationization of fillers to provide maximal filler retention.

=== Water purification ===
PolyDADMAC is used as a coagulant in water purification. It is effective in coagulating and flocculating inorganic and organic particles such as silt, clay, algae, bacteria and viruses. At high concentrations the organic polymer can remove natural organic matter such as humic and fulvic acids resulting in fewer disinfection byproduct precursors and less color.
