= Jacob Israelachvili =

Israeli physicist and chemical engineer

Jacob Nissim Israelachvili, FRS (Hebrew: יעקב ניסים ישראלכבילי; 19 August 1944 – 20 September 2018) was an Israeli physicist who was a professor at the University of California, Santa Barbara (UCSB). He made contributions in understanding the behavior of matter at small length scales.

== Personal life ==
He was born in Tel Aviv, Israel and sent to an English boarding school at the age of 7. After completing his secondary education he returned to Israel to carry out his military service before moving back to England to study the Natural Sciences Tripos at the University of Cambridge. He received his Ph.D. in Physics from Christ's College, Cambridge in 1972 under the supervision of David Tabor. He then became a Research Fellow at the Biophysics Institute, Stockholm University and at the Karolinska Institute, Sweden until 1974.

He moved to Australia to take a post as fellow in the Research School of Physical Science and the Research School of Biological Sciences at the Institute of Advanced Studies, Australian National University in Canberra from 1974 to 1977. He was then appointed senior fellow in the Department of Applied Mathematics and Department of Neurobiology at the Institute of Advanced Studies, Australian National University in Canberra.

He relocated to California to join UCSB in 1986, where he worked till his death on 20 September 2018.

== Research ==
His research has involved study of molecular and interfacial forces. His work is applicable to a wide range of industrial and fundamental science problems. In particular, he has contributed significantly to the understanding of colloidal dispersions, biological systems, and polymer engineering applications. He has studied interfacial phenomena, the physics of thin films, and fundamental questions in rheology and tribology of surfaces.

Israelachvili has developed numerous techniques for the static and dynamic measurement of material and molecular properties of vapors, liquids, and surfaces. In particular, he pioneered a sensitive interfacial force-sensing technique known as the surface forces apparatus (SFA). This instrument involves carefully approaching two surfaces (usually immersed in a solvent, such as water), and measuring the force of attraction and repulsion between them. Using piezoelectric positional movement and optical interferometry for position sensing, this instrument can resolve distances to within 0.1 nanometer, and forces at the 10^{−8} N level. This technique is similar to measuring the force of interaction between an atomic force microscope (AFM) and a sample surface, except that the specialized SFA can measure much longer-range forces and is intended for surface-surface interaction measurements (as opposed to tip-surface or molecule-surface measurements). The results of SFA experiments can be used to characterize the nature of intermolecular potentials and other molecular properties.

Israelachvili is also well known as the author of the textbook "Intermolecular and Surface Forces," published by Academic Press. This authoritative book describes the fundamental concepts and equations applicable to all intermolecular and interfacial science disciplines.

Israelachvili was also founder of SurForce, LLC. The company specializes in researching surface force interactions and producing SFA systems.

== Appointments, honors and awards ==
- Tribology Gold Medal, Institution of Mechanical Engineers (2013)
- ACS National Award in Colloid and Surface Chemistry (2009)
- Named by the AICHE as one of the “One Hundred Chemical Engineers of the Modern Era (2008)
- Honorary Degree of Doctor of Engineering – University of South Florida (2007)
- Honorary Degree of Doctor sc. h.c. - ETH Zurich (2006)
- Schlumberger Visiting Professor – University of Oxford, UK (2005)
- MRS Medal, awarded for recent work on adhesion and friction (2004)
- Elected to the US National Academy of Sciences in the area of Engineering Science (2004)
- Elected Fellow of the American Physical Society in the area of Biological Physics (2004)
- Adhesion Society Award for “excellence in adhesion science (2003)
- Fellow of the Royal Society (1988)
- Matthew Flinders Medal and Lecture (1986)
- David Syme Research Prize (1983)
- Elected a fellow of the Australian Academy of Science (1982)
- Pawsey Medal (1977)
