= Quaternium-15 =

Salt used as a surfactant

Cis/trans-Quaternium-15
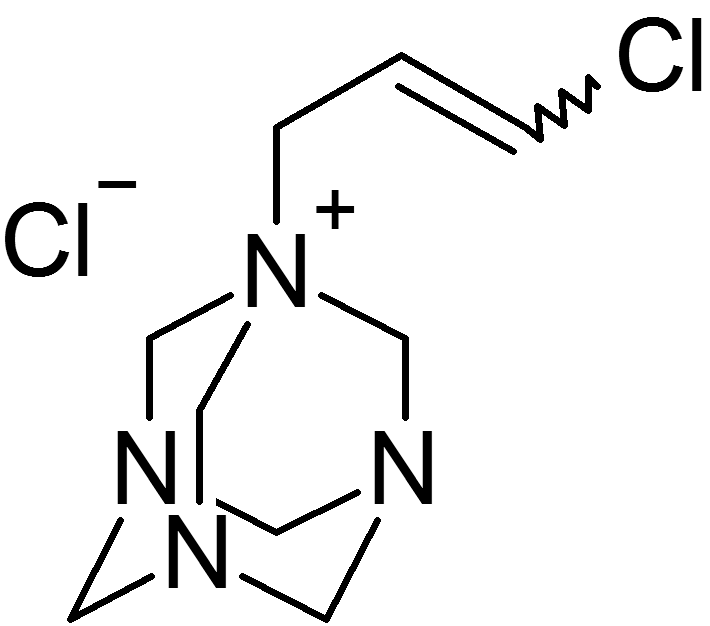

Names
- IUPAC name 1-(3-Chloroallyl)-3,5,7-triaza-1-azoniaadamantane chloride
- Other names: Dowicil 75; Dowicil 100; Dowco 184; Dowicide Q; N-(3-chloroallyl) hexaminium chloride; hexamethylenetetramine chloroallyl chloride; 3,5,7-triaza-1-azoniaadamantane; 1-(3-chloroallyl)-chloride

Identifiers
CAS Number	4080-31-3; 51229-78-8 Cis-isomer
3D model (JSmol)	Interactive image
ChemSpider	23621565
ECHA InfoCard	100.102.448
PubChem CID	6435993
UNII	E40U03LEM0; LIT014L4RH Cis-isomer
CompTox Dashboard (EPA)	DTXSID0035748
- InChI: InChI=1S/C9H16ClN4.ClH/c10-2-1-3-14-7-11-4-12(8-14)6-13(5-11)9-14;/h1-2H,3-9H2;1H/q+1;/p-1 Key: UKHVLWKBNNSRRR-UHFFFAOYSA-M; InChI=1/C9H16ClN4.ClH/c10-2-1-3-14-7-11-4-12(8-14)6-13(5-11)9-14;/h1-2H,3-9H2;1H/q+1;/p-1 Key: UKHVLWKBNNSRRR-REWHXWOFAS
- SMILES: C1N2CN3CN1C[N+](C2)(C3)CC=CCl.[Cl-]

Properties
Chemical formula	C_{9}H_{16}Cl_{2}N_{4}
Molar mass	251.16 g·mol^{−1}

Hazards
- GHS labelling
Pictograms	(GHS02: Flammable) (GHS09: Environmental hazard) (GHS07: Exclamation mark) (GHS08: Health hazard)
Hazard statements	H228, H302, H315, H317, H361, H411
Precautionary statements	P210, P273, P280
Safety data sheet (SDS)	Sigma Aldrich
- Except where otherwise noted, data are given for materials in their standard state (at 25 °C [77 °F], 100 kPa). verify (what is ?) Infobox references

Quaternium-15 (systematic name: hexamethylenetetramine chloroallyl chloride) is a quaternary ammonium salt that has been used as a surfactant and preservative. It acts as an antimicrobial agent because it slowly releases formaldehyde, which is a preservative with biocidal properties.

Both quaternium-15 and formaldehyde release agents have been the subjects of controversy. They are banned in much of the US and Europe.

It can be found under a variety of names, including Dow Chemical Company: Dowicil 200 (cis isomer only), Dowicil 75 and Dowicil 100 (both a mix of cis and trans isomers).

== Synthesis ==
Quaternium-15 can be prepared by treating hexamethylenetetramine with 1,3-dichloropropene. A mixture of cis and trans isomers are produced.

== Applications ==
The isolated cis-compound is used primarily in cosmetic applications, with a maximum permitted concentration in the EU of 0.2%. The mixed product (cis- and trans-) is used in a wider range of formulations such as: emulsifiable metal-cutting fluids, latex and emulsion paints, liquid floor polishes and floor waxes, and glues and adhesives.

== Safety concerns ==
Quaternium-15 has been banned in the EU since 2017 and a bill was introduced in the US in 2017 to require the FDA to investigate its safety.

=== Allergic reaction ===
Quaternium-15 is an allergen, and can cause dermatitis. Many of those with an allergy to quaternium-15 are also allergic to formaldehyde. At low pH values, it would be expected to release significant amounts of formaldehyde due to acid hydrolysis via the Delepine reaction. Allergic sensitivity to quaternium-15 can be detected using a patch test. It is the single most often found cause of allergic contact dermatitis of the hands (16.5% in 959 cases). In 2005–06, it was the fourth most prevalent allergen in patch tests (10.3%).

Even though quaternium-15 releases low amounts of formaldehyde, Johnson & Johnson announced plans to phase out its use of quaternium-15 in cosmetic products by 2015 in response to consumer pressure.

== See also ==
- Polyquaternium
