= Polyampholytes =

Polymers with cationic and anionic groups

Polyampholytes are polymers that contain both positively charged (cationic) and negatively charged (anionic) functional groups within the same molecule. Their unique structure allows them to exhibit amphoteric behavior, meaning they can interact with a range of substances depending on the surrounding pH, making them useful in applications like drug delivery, water treatment, and biomaterials.

Polyampholytes can exist as either linear water-soluble polyelectrolytes or as cross-linked structures. Weakly cross-linked polyampholytes swell in water, forming hydrogels. The swelling properties of these hydrogels are highly dependent on the solution pH and its relation to the polyampholyte’s isoelectric point.

The isoelectric point of polyampholytes is the pH at which the polymer exhibits no net charge, balancing its positive and negative charges. This point is important because it dictates the net charge of polyampholyte macromolecules at different pH levels. At a pH less than the isoelectric point, the macromolecules carry a positive charge, while at a pH greater than the isoelectric point, they acquire a negative charge. At pH equal to the isoelectric point, polyampholytes are neutral. Under these conditions, they may show minimal viscosity in solutions or lose solubility and precipitate.

Proteins are a class of natural polyampholytes, as they contain both positively and negatively charged amino acid residues within their structure. These charges are influenced by the pH of the surrounding environment, which determines the overall charge of the protein. The presence of both acidic (anionic) and basic (cationic) residues allows proteins to interact with various charged species, making them versatile in biological processes.

Gelatin is a well-known example of a protein-derived polyampholyte. It is derived from collagen, a structural protein found in connective tissues, and contains both acidic (anionic) and basic (cationic) amino acid residues, making it capable of exhibiting amphoteric behavior. The unique combination of these charges allows gelatin to interact with a variety of substances, depending on the pH of the surrounding environment.

== Applications ==
Synthetic polyampholytes have a range of potential applications. They can adhere to mucosal surfaces, enhance drug retention and improve bioavailability by adjusting their charge at specific pH's. In water treatment, polyampholytes act as flocculants. In biomaterials, they are utilized in tissue engineering, wound dressings, and as scaffolds for cell growth, taking advantage of their biocompatibility and adjustable charge properties. Furthermore, polyampholytes serve as cryoprotectants in cryopreservation, stabilizing biological samples like cells and tissues during freezing by preventing ice crystal formation and reducing cellular damage. Polyampholytes are potential stealth coatings, creating anti-fouling surfaces that resist biofilm formation.
