= Yeast flocculation =

Yeast flocculation typically refers to the reversible clumping together (flocculation) of brewing yeast once the sugar in a wort has been fermented into beer. In the case of "top-fermenting" ale yeast (Saccharomyces cerevisiae), the yeast creates a krausen, or barm on the top of the liquid, unlike "bottom-fermenting" lager yeast (Saccharomyces pastorianus) where the yeast falls to the bottom of the brewing vessel.

== Process ==
Cell aggregation occurs throughout microbiology, in bacteria, filamentous algae, fungi and yeast. Yeast are capable of forming three aggregates; mating aggregates, for DNA exchange; chain formation; and flocs as a survival strategy in adverse conditions. Industrial brewing strains rarely mate. Therefore, only chain formation and flocculation are of relevance to the brewing industry.

Yeast flocculation is distinct from agglomeration (‘grit’ formation), which is irreversible and occurs most commonly in baker's yeast when strains fail to separate when resuspended. Agglomeration only occurs following the pressing and rehydration of yeast cakes and both flocculent and non-flocculent yeast strains have been shown to demonstrate agglomeration. It is also distinct from the formation of biofilms, which occurs on a solid substrate.

Louis Pasteur is erroneously credited with first describing flocculation of brewer’s yeast. Brewer's yeast flocculation has been the subject of many reviews. Flocculation has been defined as the reversible, non-sexual aggregation of yeast cells that may be dispersed by specific sugars or EDTA. The addition of nutrients other than sugars has been demonstrated not to reverse flocculation. This is as opposed to mating aggregates formed as a prelude to sexual fusion between complementary yeast cells.

For flocculation to occur the yeast must be flocculent and certain environmental conditions must be present. Several factors are important in cell-to-cell binding such as surface charge, hydrophobic effects and zymolectin interactions. The importance of these forces in brewing yeast flocculation was unrecognized in the past but work by Speers et al. (2006) have indicated the importance of zymolectin and hydrophobic interactions. As the cells are too large to be moved by Brownian motion, for binding of two or more cells to occur the cells must be subjected to low level of agitation.

== Zymolectin interaction theory ==
The accepted mechanism of flocculation involves a protein-carbohydrate model. Fully flocculent yeast cells exhibit carbohydrate α-mannan receptors and protein zymolectins. Zymolectins are so termed as they may not be true bivalent lectins. It has been suggested that zymolectin interactions between the protein and mannan moities results in the flocculation phenotype with Ca^{2+} ions required for the correct conformation of the zymolectins. Co-flocculation between Kluyveromyces and Schizosaccharomyces has been shown to be by a “lectinic” mechanism.

=== Flocculation zymolectins and phenotypes ===
Three flocculation phenotypes have been elucidated based on the zymolectins they produce: Flo1 (Stratford and Assinder, 1991) NewFlo (Stratford and Assinder, 1991) and Mannose Insensitive (MI). These flocculation phenotypes differ in the time of the onset of flocculation and the sugar inhibition of flocculation. The genetic control of yeast flocculation has not been extensively studied. Recent reports suggest genes encoding lectin-like proteins exhibit close sequence homology. Furthermore, it seems that FLO genes have interchangeable functions that can compensate for one another.

=== Flocculation phenotypes ===
The Flo1 phenotype is inhibited by mannose occurs in both ale and lager strains.

The NewFlo phenotype differs from that of Flo1 in several ways. Firstly NewFlo flocculation is inhibited by mannose, glucose and maltose. Secondly the NewFlo lectin is putatively encoded by the FLO10 gene. Studies by the Speers group have indicated little change in zymolectin levels through a fermentation. It is argued that lectin maturation occurs some fourteen hours after the cessation of cell division and is therefore not concomitant with entry into stationary phase, although this is strain dependent. However the molecular proof of this maturation is near non-existent. The picture is complicated by changes in cell surface hydrophobicity and CO_{2} driven shear which confounds flocculation measurements often erroneously solely attributed to zymolectin interactions. While flocculation (clumping and settling) occurs at this time, this flocculation occurs as a result of changes in hydrophobicity and a decline in sugar and shear due to which is in turn to low CO_{2} evolution.
