= Polypyridinium salts =

Polypyridinium salts are members of a class of main chain polyelectrolytes.
