= Mineral hydration =

Chemical reaction adding water to a mineral's crystal structure

In inorganic chemistry, mineral hydration is a reaction which adds water to the crystal structure of a mineral, usually creating a new mineral, commonly called a hydrate.

In geological terms, the process of mineral hydration is known as retrograde alteration and is a process occurring in retrograde metamorphism. It commonly accompanies metasomatism and is often a feature of wall rock alteration around ore bodies. Hydration of minerals occurs generally in concert with hydrothermal circulation, which may be driven by tectonic or igneous activity.

== Processes ==
There are two main ways in which minerals hydrate. One is conversion of an oxide to a double hydroxide, as with the hydration of calcium oxide—CaO—to calcium hydroxide—Ca(OH)_{2}. The other is with the incorporation of water molecules directly into the crystalline structure of a new mineral, as with the hydration of feldspars to clay minerals, garnet to chlorite, or kyanite to muscovite.

Mineral hydration is also a process in the regolith that results in conversion of silicate minerals into clay minerals.

Some mineral structures, for example, montmorillonite, are capable of including a variable amount of water without significant change to the mineral structure.

Hydration is the mechanism by which hydraulic binders such as Portland cement develop strength. A hydraulic binder is a material that can set and harden submerged in water by forming insoluble products in a hydration reaction. The term hydraulicity or hydraulic activity is indicative of the chemical affinity of the hydration reaction.

== Examples of hydrated minerals ==
Examples of hydrated minerals include:

- silicates (SiO^{4−}_{4}, SiO_{2})
  - phyllosilicates, clay minerals "commonly found on Earth as weathering products of rocks or in hydrothermal systems"
    - chlorite
    - muscovite
- non-silicates
  - oxides (O^{2−}, Al_{2}O_{3}, Fe_{2}O_{3}, etc.) and oxy-hydroxides
    - brucite, Mg(OH)_{2}
    - goethite, FeO(OH)
  - carbonates (CO^{2−}_{3}, etc.)
    - hydromagnesite, Mg_{5}(CO_{3})_{4}(OH)_{2}·4H_{2}O
    - ikaite, CaCO_{3}·6H_{2}O, the unstable hexahydrate form of calcium carbonate
  - hydroxylated minerals
    - saponite
    - talc
  - hydroxysulfides (mixed sulfides-hydroxides)
    - tochilinite, a hydroxysulfide or hydrated sulfide mineral of iron(II) and magnesium of chemical formula:
      (Fe^{2+})_{5.4}(Mg,Fe^{2+})_{5}S_{6}(OH)_{10}, also written 6 Fe_{0.9}S · 5 (Mg,Fe^{2+})(OH)_{2}, in IMA notation
    - valleriite, an uncommon sulfide-hydroxide mineral of iron(II) and copper of chemical formula:
      (Fe^{2+},Cu)_{4}(Mg,Al)_{3}S_{4}(OH,O)_{6}, or 4 (Fe,Cu)S · 3 (Mg,Al)(OH)_{2}

== See also ==
- Clay-water interaction
- Hydration reaction
- Iron(III) oxide-hydroxide
- Ferrihydrite
