= Peptization =

Method of converting a mixture containing precipitate into a colloid

The peptization of a liquid mixture is the process of converting the mixture into a colloid by shaking it with a suitable electrolyte called a peptizing agent. That is, the insoluble solid particles which have settled out of the mixture (i.e. the precipitate) are reformed into microscopic particles suspended in the mixture. Peptization is the reverse of flocculation, the aggregation of colloidal particles into precipitate; as such, it is also known as deflocculation.

This is particularly important in colloid chemistry or for precipitation reactions in an aqueous solution. When colloidal particles bear a same sign electric charge, they mutually repel each other and cannot aggregate together. Freshly precipitated aluminium or iron hydroxide is extremely difficult to filter because the very fine colloidal particles directly pass through a paper filter. To facilitate the filtration, the colloidal suspension must be first flocculated by adding a concentrated solution of salt to the system. Multivalent cations are more efficient flocculants than monovalent cations: AlCl_{3} > CaCl_{2} > NaCl. The electrical charges present at the surface of the particles are so "neutralised" and disappear. More correctly speaking, the electrical double layer existing at the surface of the particles is compressed by the added electrolyte and collapses at high ionic strength. The electrical repulsion no longer hinders the aggregation of particles and they can then coalesce to form a flocculent precipitate that is easy to filter. If the precipitate is washed with an excessive volume of deionised water, the electrical double layer present at the surface of the particles expands again and the electrical repulsion reappears: the precipitate peptizes and the particles pass again through the filter.

Peptization is also used in nanoparticle synthesis to make a large grouping of particles split into many primary particles. This is done by changing the surface properties, applying a charge, or by adding a surfactant.

In the synthesis of titania (titanium dioxide) nanoparticles, peptization involves adsorption of quaternary ammonium cation on the titania surface. This causes the surface to become positively charged. Electrostatic repulsion of the primary particles in the agglomerated titania breaks up the agglomerate into primary particles. The efficacy of adsorbates or suspension modification in imparting interparticle electrostatic repulsion is most commonly studied in terms of zeta potential.

== See also ==
- Colloid
- Suspension
- Zeta potential
- Dispersion
