= Polyquaternium =

Term for several polymers used by the cosmetics industry

Polyquaternium is the International Nomenclature for Cosmetic Ingredients designation for several polycationic polymers that are used in the personal care industry. Polyquaternium is a neologism used to emphasize the presence of quaternary ammonium centers in the polymer. INCI has approved at least 40 different polymers under the polyquaternium designation. Different polymers are distinguished by the numerical value that follows the word "polyquaternium". Polyquaternium-5, polyquaternium-7, and polyquaternium-47 are three examples, each a chemically different type of polymer. The numbers are assigned in the order in which they are registered rather than because of their chemical structure.

Polyquaterniums find particular application in conditioners, shampoo, hair mousse, hair spray, hair dye, personal lubricant, and contact lens solutions. Because they are positively charged, they neutralize the negative charges of most shampoos and hair proteins and help hair lie flat. Their positive charges also ionically bond them to hair and skin. Some have antimicrobial properties.

List of Polyquaterniums
Polyquaternium	Chemical Identity
Polyquaternium-1	Ethanol, 2,2′,2″ -nitrilotris-, polymer with 1,4-dichloro-2-butene and N,N,N′,N′-tetramethyl-2-butene-1,4-diamine
Polyquaternium-2	Poly[bis(2-chloroethyl) ether-alt-1,3-bis[3-(dimethylamino)propyl]urea]
Polyquaternium-4	Hydroxyethyl cellulose dimethyl diallylammonium chloride copolymer; Diallyldimethylammonium chloride-hydroxyethyl cellulose copolymer
Polyquaternium-5	Copolymer of acrylamide and quaternized dimethylammoniumethyl methacrylate
Polyquaternium-6	Poly(diallyldimethylammonium chloride)
Polyquaternium-7	Copolymer of acrylamide and diallyldimethylammonium chloride
Polyquaternium-8	Copolymer of methyl and stearyl dimethylaminoethyl ester of methacrylic acid, quaternized with dimethylsulphate
Polyquaternium-9	Homopolymer of N,N-(dimethylamino)ethyl ester of methacrylic acid, quaternized with bromomethane
Polyquaternium-10	Quaternized hydroxyethyl cellulose
Polyquaternium-11	Copolymer of vinylpyrrolidone and quaternized dimethylaminoethyl methacrylate
Polyquaternium-12	Ethyl methacrylate / abietyl methacrylate / diethylaminoethyl methacrylate copolymer quaternized with dimethyl sulfate
Polyquaternium-13	Ethyl methacrylate / oleyl methacrylate / diethylaminoethyl methacrylate copolymer quaternized with dimethyl sulfate
Polyquaternium-14	Trimethylaminoethylmethacrylate homopolymer
Polyquaternium-15	Acrylamide-dimethylaminoethyl methacrylate methyl chloride copolymer
Polyquaternium-16	Copolymer of vinylpyrrolidone and quaternized vinylimidazole
Polyquaternium-17	Adipic acid, dimethylaminopropylamine and dichloroethylether copolymer
Polyquaternium-18	Azelaic acid, dimethylaminopropylamine and dichloroethylether copolymer
Polyquaternium-19	Copolymer of polyvinyl alcohol and 2,3-epoxypropylamine
Polyquaternium-20	Copolymer of polyvinyl octadecyl ether and 2,3-epoxypropylamine
Polyquaternium-22	Copolymer of acrylic acid and diallyldimethylammonium Chloride
Polyquaternium-24	Quaternary ammonium salt of hydroxyethyl cellulose reacted with a lauryl dimethyl ammonium substituted epoxide.
Polyquaternium-27	Block copolymer of Polyquaternium-2 and Polyquaternium-17
Polyquaternium-28	Copolymer of vinylpyrrolidone and methacrylamidopropyl trimethylammonium
Polyquaternium-29	Chitosan modified with propylen oxide and quaternized with epichlorhydrin
Polyquaternium-30	Ethanaminium, N-(carboxymethyl)-N,N-dimethyl-2-[(2-methyl-1-oxo-2-propen-1-yl)oxy]-, inner salt, polymer with methyl 2-methyl-2-propenoate
Polyquaternium-31	N,N- dimethylaminopropyl-N-acrylamidine quatemized with diethylsulfate bound to a block of polyacrylonitrile
Polyquaternium-32	Poly(acrylamide 2-methacryloxyethyltrimethyl ammonium chloride)
Polyquaternium-33	Copolymer of trimethylaminoethylacrylate salt and acrylamide
Polyquaternium-34	Copolymer of 1,3-dibromopropane and N,N-diethyl-N′,N′-dimethyl-1,3-propanediamine
Polyquaternium-35	Methosulphate of the copolymer of methacryloyloxyethyltrimethylammonium and of methacryloyloxyethyldimethylacetylammonium
Polyquaternium-36	Copolymer of N,N-dimethylaminoethylmethacrylate and buthylmethacrylate, quaternized with dimethylsulphate
Polyquaternium-37	Poly(2-methacryloxyethyltrimethylammonium chloride)
Polyquaternium-39	Terpolymer of acrylic acid, acrylamide and diallyldimethylammonium Chloride
Polyquaternium-42	Poly[oxyethylene(dimethylimino)ethylene (dimethylimino)ethylene dichloride]
Polyquaternium-43	Copolymer of acrylamide, acrylamidopropyltrimonium chloride, 2-amidopropylacrylamide sulfonate and dimethylaminopropylamine
Polyquaternium-44	3-Methyl-1-vinylimidazolium methyl sulfate-N-vinylpyrrolidone copolymer
Polyquaternium-45	Copolymer of (N-methyl-N-ethoxyglycine)methacrylate and N,N-dimethylaminoethylmethacrylate, quaternized with dimethyl sulphate
Polyquaternium-46	Terpolymer of vinylcaprolactam, vinylpyrrolidone, and quaternized vinylimidazole
Polyquaternium-47	Terpolymer of acrylic acid, methacrylamidopropyl trimethylammonium chloride, and methyl acrylate

== See also ==
- Ionomer
