= Clarifying agent =

Agent used to remove suspended solids from liquid

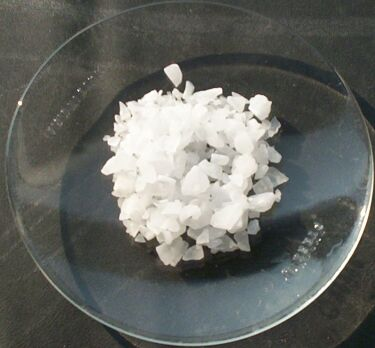
A sample of the hexadecahydrate of aluminium sulfate

Clarifying agents are used to remove suspended solids from liquids by inducing flocculation, causing the solids to form larger aggregates that can be easily removed after they either float to the surface or sink to the bottom of the containment vessel.

== Process ==
Particles finer than 0.1 μm (10^{−7}m) in water remain continuously in motion due to electrostatic charge (often negative) which causes them to repel each other. Once their electrostatic charge is neutralized by the use of a coagulant chemical, the finer particles start to collide and agglomerate (collect together) under the influence of Van der Waals forces. These larger and heavier particles are called flocs.

Flocculants, or flocculating agents (also known as flocking agents), are chemicals that promote flocculation by causing colloids and other suspended particles in liquids to aggregate, forming a floc. Flocculants are used in water treatment processes to improve the sedimentation or filterability of small particles. For example, a flocculant may be used in swimming pool or drinking water filtration to aid removal of microscopic particles which would otherwise cause the water to be turbid (cloudy) and which would be difficult or impossible to remove by filtration alone.

Many flocculants are multivalent cations such as aluminium, iron, calcium or magnesium. These positively charged molecules interact with negatively charged particles and molecules to reduce the barriers to aggregation. In addition, many of these chemicals, under appropriate pH and other conditions such as temperature and salinity, react with water to form insoluble hydroxides which, upon precipitating, link together to form long chains or meshes, physically trapping small particles into the larger floc.

Long-chain polymer flocculants, such as modified polyacrylamides, are manufactured and sold by flocculant producers. These can be supplied in dry or liquid form for use in the flocculation process. The most common liquid polyacrylamide is supplied as an emulsion with 10-40% actives and the rest is a non-aqueous carrier fluid, surfactants and latex. This form allows easy handling of viscous polymers at high concentrations. These emulsion polymers require "activation" — inversion of the emulsion so that the polymer's molecules form an aqueous solution.

== Agents ==
- alum
- aluminium chlorohydrate
- aluminium sulfate
- calcium oxide
- calcium hydroxide
- iron(II) sulfate (ferrous sulfate)
- iron(III) chloride (ferric chloride)
- polyacrylamide
- polyDADMAC
- sodium aluminate
- sodium silicate

The following natural products are used as flocculants:

- Chitosan
- Isinglass
- Moringa oleifera seeds (Horseradish tree)
- Gelatin
- Strychnos potatorum seeds (Nirmali nut tree)
- Guar gum
- Alginates (brown seaweed extracts)

== See also ==
- Finings
- Clarification and stabilization of wine
- Particle aggregation
- Coagulation
