= Compendium of Macromolecular Nomenclature =

Chemistry reference work

The Compendium of Macromolecular Nomenclature, by the International Union of Pure and Applied Chemistry (IUPAC), provides definition of polymer related terms and rules of nomenclature of polymers. It is referred to as the Purple Book. It was published in 1991 (ISBN 0-63202-8475) by Blackwell Science. The author of this book is W.V. Metanomski.

The expansion of this book named Compendium of Polymer Terminology and Nomenclature: IUPAC Recommendations, 2008 was published by the Royal Society of Chemistry in 2009 (ISBN 978 0 85404 491 7).

The rules and definitions were set up by the IUPAC Commission on Macromolecular Nomenclature. The work was carried on by the Subcommittee on Polymer Terminology (IUPAC Division IV) after the Commission on Macromolecular Nomenclature was terminated.
