= Polyelectrolyte =

Polymers whose repeating units bear an electrolyte group

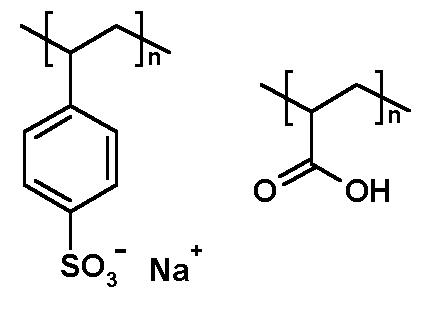
Chemical structures of two synthetic polyelectrolytes, as examples. To the left is poly(sodium styrene sulfonate) (PSS), and to the right is polyacrylic acid (PAA). Both are negatively charged polyelectrolytes when dissociated. PSS is a 'strong' polyelectrolyte (fully charged in solution), whereas PAA is 'weak' (partially charged).

Polyelectrolytes are polymers whose repeating units bear an electrolyte group. Polycations and polyanions are polyelectrolytes. These groups dissociate in aqueous solutions (water), making the polymers charged. Polyelectrolyte properties are thus similar to both electrolytes (salts) and polymers (high molecular weight compounds) and are sometimes called polysalts. Like salts, their solutions are electrically conductive. Like polymers, their solutions are often viscous. Charged molecular chains, commonly present in soft matter systems, play a fundamental role in determining structure, stability and the interactions of various molecular assemblies. Theoretical approaches to describe their statistical properties differ profoundly from those of their electrically neutral counterparts, while technological and industrial fields exploit their unique properties. Many biological molecules are polyelectrolytes. For instance, polypeptides, glycosaminoglycans, and DNA are polyelectrolytes. Both natural and synthetic polyelectrolytes are used in a variety of industries.

IUPAC definition

polyelectrolyte: Polymer composed of macromolecules in which a substantial portion of the constitutional units contains ionic or ionizable groups, or both. (See Gold Book entry for note.)

== Charge ==
Acids are classified as either weak or strong (and bases similarly may be either weak or strong). Similarly, polyelectrolytes can be divided into "weak" and "strong" types. A "strong" polyelectrolyte dissociates completely in solution for most reasonable pH values. A "weak" polyelectrolyte, by contrast, has a dissociation constant (pKa or pKb) in the range of ~2 to ~10, meaning that it will be partially dissociated at intermediate pH. Thus, weak polyelectrolytes are not fully charged in the solution, and moreover, their fractional charge can be modified by changing the solution pH, counter-ion concentration, or ionic strength.

The physical properties of polyelectrolyte solutions are usually strongly affected by this degree of ionization. Since the polyelectrolyte dissociation releases counter-ions, this necessarily affects the solution's ionic strength, and therefore the Debye length. This, in turn, affects other properties, such as electrical conductivity.

When solutions of two oppositely charged polymers (that is, a solution of polycation and one of polyanion) are mixed, a bulk complex (precipitate) is usually formed. This occurs because the oppositely-charged polymers attract one another and bind together.

== Conformation ==
The conformation of any polymer is affected by a number of factors, notably the polymer architecture and the solvent affinity. In the case of polyelectrolytes, charge also has an effect. Whereas an uncharged linear polymer chain is usually found in a random conformation in solution (closely approximating a self-avoiding three-dimensional random walk), the charges on a linear polyelectrolyte chain will repel each other via double layer forces, which causes the chain to adopt a more expanded, rigid-rod-like conformation. The charges will be screened if the solution contains a great deal of added salt. Consequently, the polyelectrolyte chain will collapse to a more conventional conformation (essentially identical to a neutral chain in good solvent).

Polymer conformation affects many bulk properties (such as viscosity, turbidity, etc.). Although the statistical conformation of polyelectrolytes can be captured using variants of conventional polymer theory, it is, in general, quite computationally intensive to properly model polyelectrolyte chains, owing to the long-range nature of the electrostatic interaction. Techniques such as static light scattering can be used to study polyelectrolyte conformation and conformational changes.

== Polyampholytes ==
IUPAC definition

ampholytic polymer: Polyelectrolyte composed of macromolecules containing both cationic and anionic groups, or corresponding ionizable groups. (See Gold Book entry for note.)

Polyelectrolytes that bear both cationic and anionic repeat groups are called polyampholytes. The competition between the acid-base equilibria of these groups leads to additional complications in their physical behavior. These polymers usually only dissolve when sufficient added salt screens the interactions between oppositely charged segments. In the case of amphoteric macroporous hydrogels, the action of concentrated salt solution does not lead to the dissolution of polyampholyte material due to the covalent cross-linking of macromolecules. Synthetic 3-D macroporous hydrogels shows the excellent ability to adsorb heavy-metal ions in a wide range of pH from extremely diluted aqueous solutions, which can be later used as an adsorbent for purification of salty water All proteins are polyampholytes, as some amino acids tend to be acidic, while others are basic.

== Applications ==
Polyelectrolytes have many applications, mostly related to modifying flow and stability properties of aqueous solutions and gels. For instance, they can be used to destabilize a colloidal suspension and to initiate flocculation (precipitation). They can also be used to impart a surface charge to neutral particles, enabling them to be dispersed in aqueous solution. They are thus often used as thickeners, emulsifiers, conditioners, clarifying agents, and even drag reducers. They are used in water treatment and for oil recovery. Many soaps, shampoos, and cosmetics incorporate polyelectrolytes. Furthermore, they are added to many foods and to concrete mixtures (superplasticizer). Some of the polyelectrolytes that appear on food labels are pectin, carrageenan, alginates, and carboxymethyl cellulose. All but the last are of natural origin. Finally, they are used in various materials, including cement.

Because some of them are water-soluble, they are also investigated for biochemical and medical applications. There is currently much research on using biocompatible polyelectrolytes for implant coatings, controlled drug release, and other applications. Thus, recently, the biocompatible and biodegradable macroporous material composed of polyelectrolyte complex was described, where the material exhibited excellent proliferation of mammalian cells and muscle like soft actuators.

== Multilayers ==
Polyelectrolytes have been used in the formation of new types of materials known as polyelectrolyte multilayers ('PEMs). These thin films are constructed using a layer-by-layer (LbL) deposition technique. During LbL deposition, a suitable growth substrate (usually charged) is dipped back and forth between dilute baths of positively and negatively charged polyelectrolyte solutions. During each dip, a small amount of polyelectrolyte is adsorbed, and the surface charge is reversed, allowing the gradual and controlled build-up of electrostatically cross-linked films of polycation-polyanion layers. Scientists have demonstrated thickness control of such films down to the single-nanometer scale. LbL films can also be constructed by substituting charged species such as nanoparticles or clay platelets in place of or in addition to one of the polyelectrolytes. LbL deposition has also been accomplished using hydrogen bonding instead of electrostatics. For more information on multilayer creation, please see polyelectrolyte adsorption.

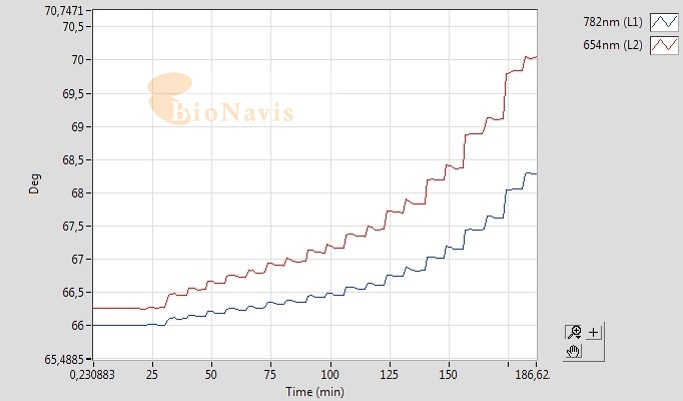
Formation of 20 layers of PSS-PAH polyelectrolyte multilayer measured by multi-parametric surface plasmon resonance

An LbL formation of PEM (PSS-PAH (poly(allylamine) hydrochloride)) on a gold substrate can be seen in the Figure. The formation is measured using multi-parametric surface plasmon resonance to determine adsorption kinetics, layer thickness, and optical density.

The main benefits of PEM coatings are the ability to conformably coat objects (that is, the technique is not limited to coating flat objects), the environmental benefits of using water-based processes, reasonable costs, and the utilization of the particular chemical properties of the film for further modification, such as the synthesis of metal or semiconductor nanoparticles, or porosity phase transitions to create anti-reflective coatings, optical shutters, and superhydrophobic coatings.

== Bridging ==
If polyelectrolyte chains are added to a system of charged macroions (i.e., an array of DNA molecules), an interesting phenomenon called the polyelectrolyte bridging might occur. The term bridging interactions is usually applied to the situation where a single polyelectrolyte chain can adsorb to two (or more) oppositely charged macroions (e.g. DNA molecule) thus establishing molecular bridges and, via its connectivity, mediate attractive interactions between them.

At small macroion separations, the chain is squeezed in between the macroions and electrostatic effects in the system are completely dominated by steric effects – the system is effectively discharged. As we increase the macroion separation, we simultaneously stretch the polyelectrolyte chain adsorbed to them. The stretching of the chain gives rise to the above-mentioned attractive interactions due to the chain's rubber elasticity.

Because of its connectivity, the behavior of the polyelectrolyte chain bears almost no resemblance to that of confined, unconnected ions.

== Polyacid ==
In polymer terminology, a polyacid is a polyelectrolyte composed of macromolecules containing acid groups on a substantial fraction of the constitutional units. Most commonly, the acid groups are –COOH, –SO_{3}H, or –PO_{3}H_{2}.

== See also ==
- Dispersity
- Ion-exchange resin
- Polypyridinium salts
