= Particle aggregation =

Clumping of particles in suspension

Particle agglomeration refers to the formation of assemblages in a suspension and represents a mechanism leading to the functional destabilization of colloidal systems. During this process, particles dispersed in the liquid phase stick to each other, and spontaneously form irregular particle assemblages, flocs, or agglomerates. This phenomenon is also referred to as coagulation or flocculation and such a suspension is also called unstable. Particle agglomeration can be induced by adding salts or other chemicals referred to as coagulant or flocculant.

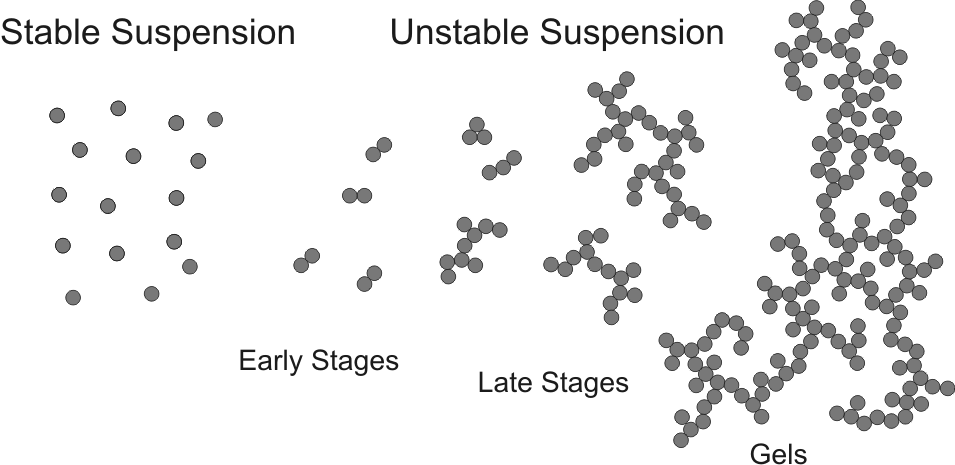
Scheme of particle agglomeration. Particles are dispersed individually in a functionally stable suspension, while they agglomerate in a functionally unstable suspension. As agglomeration proceed from early to later states, the agglomerates grow in size, and may eventually gel.

Particle agglomeration can be a reversible or irreversible process. Particle agglomerates defined as "hard agglomerates" are more difficult to redisperse to the initial single particles. In the course of agglomeration, the agglomerates will grow in size, and as a consequence they may settle to the bottom of the container, which is referred to as sedimentation. Alternatively, a colloidal gel may form in concentrated suspensions which changes its rheological properties. The reverse process whereby particle agglomerates are re-dispersed as individual particles, referred to as peptization, hardly occurs spontaneously, but may occur under stirring or shear.

Colloidal particles may also remain dispersed in liquids for long periods of time (days to years). This phenomenon is referred to as colloidal stability and such a suspension is said to be functionally stable. Stable suspensions are often obtained at low salt concentrations or by addition of chemicals referred to as stabilizers or stabilizing agents. The stability of particles, colloidal or otherwise, is most commonly evaluated in terms of zeta potential. This parameter provides a readily quantifiable measure of interparticle repulsion, which is the key inhibitor of particle aggregation.

Similar agglomeration processes occur in other dispersed systems too. In emulsions, they may also be coupled to droplet coalescence, and not only lead to sedimentation but also to creaming. In aerosols, airborne particles may equally aggregate and form larger clusters (e.g., soot).

== Early stages ==
A well dispersed colloidal suspension consists of individual, separated particles and is stabilized by repulsive inter-particle forces. When the repulsive forces weaken or become attractive through the addition of a coagulant, particles start to aggregate. Initially, particle doublets A_{2} will form from singlets A_{1} according to the scheme

$\ce{A1 + A1 -> A2}$

In the early stage of the aggregation process, the suspension mainly contains individual particles. The rate of this phenomenon is characterized by the aggregation rate coefficient k. Since doublet formation is a second order rate process, the units of this coefficients are m^{3}s^{−1} since particle concentrations are expressed as particle number per unit volume (m^{−3}). Since absolute aggregation rates are difficult to measure, one often refers to the dimensionless stability ratio W, defined as $W = \frac{k_\text{fast}}{k}$ where k_{fast} is the aggregation rate coefficient in the fast regime, and k the coefficient at the conditions of interest. The stability ratio is close to unity in the fast regime, increases in the slow regime, and becomes very large when the suspension is stable.

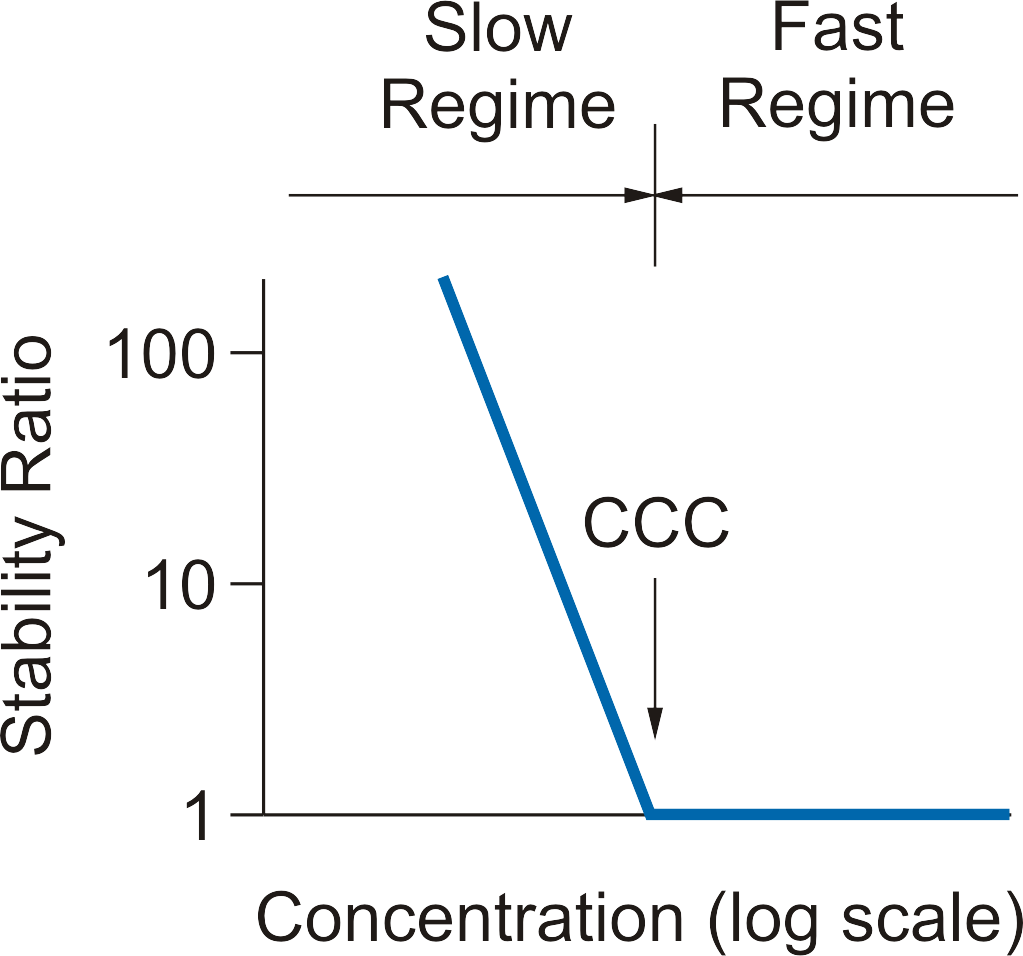
Schematic stability plot of a colloidal suspension versus the salt concentration.

Often, colloidal particles are suspended in water. In this case, they accumulate a surface charge and an electrical double layer forms around each particle. The overlap between the diffuse layers of two approaching particles results in a repulsive double layer interaction potential, which leads to particle stabilization. When salt is added to the suspension, the electrical double layer repulsion is screened, and van der Waals attraction become dominant and induce fast aggregation. The figure on the right shows the typical dependence of the stability ratio W versus the electrolyte concentration, whereby the regimes of slow and fast aggregation are indicated.

The table below summarizes the critical coagulation concentration (CCC) ranges for different net charge of the counter ion. The charge is expressed in units of elementary charge. This dependence reflects the Schulze–Hardy rule, which states that the CCC varies as the inverse sixth power of the counter ion charge. The CCC also depends on the type of ion somewhat, even if they carry the same charge. This dependence may reflect different particle properties or different ion affinities to the particle surface. Since particles are frequently negatively charged, multivalent metal cations thus represent highly effective coagulants.

Charge	CCC ( × 10^{−3} mol/L)
1	50-300
2	2-30
3	0.03-0.5

Adsorption of oppositely charged species (e.g., protons, specifically adsorbing ions, surfactants, or polyelectrolytes) may destabilize a particle suspension by charge neutralization or stabilize it by buildup of charge, leading to a fast aggregation near the charge neutralization point, and slow aggregation away from it.

Quantitative interpretation of colloidal stability was first formulated within the DLVO theory. This theory confirms the existence slow and fast aggregation regimes, even though in the slow regime the dependence on the salt concentration is often predicted to be much stronger than observed experimentally. The Schulze–Hardy rule can be derived from DLVO theory as well.

Other mechanisms of colloid stabilization are equally possible, particularly, involving polymers. Adsorbed or grafted polymers may form a protective layer around the particles, induce steric repulsive forces, and lead to steric stabilization at it is the case with polycarboxylate ether (PCE), the last generation of chemically tailored superplasticizer specifically designed to increase the workability of concrete while reducing its water content to improve its properties and durability. When polymers chains adsorb to particles loosely, a polymer chain may bridge two particles, and induce bridging forces. This situation is referred to as bridging flocculation.

When particle aggregation is solely driven by diffusion, one refers to perikinetic aggregation. Aggregation can be enhanced through shear stress (e.g., stirring). The latter case is called orthokinetic aggregation.

== Later stages ==
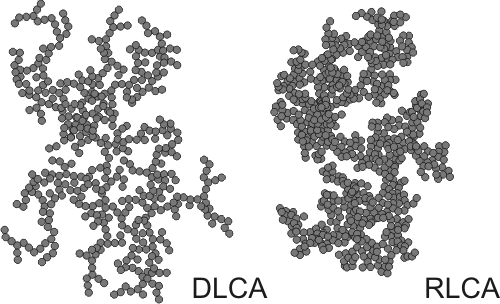
Structure of larger aggregates formed can be different. In the fast aggregation regime or DLCA regime, the aggregates are more ramified, while in the slow aggregation regime or RLCA regime, the aggregates are more compact.

As the aggregation process continues, larger clusters form. The growth occurs mainly through encounters between different clusters, and therefore one refers to cluster-cluster aggregation process. The resulting clusters are irregular, but statistically self-similar. They are examples of mass fractals, whereby their mass M grows with their typical size characterized by the radius of gyration R_{g} as a power-law

$$M \propto R_g^d$$

where d is the mass fractal dimension. Depending whether the aggregation is fast or slow, one refers to diffusion limited cluster aggregation (DLCA) or reaction limited cluster aggregation (RLCA). The clusters have different characteristics in each regime. DLCA clusters are loose and ramified (d ≈ 1.8), while the RLCA clusters are more compact (d ≈ 2.1). The cluster size distribution is also different in these two regimes. DLCA clusters are relatively monodisperse, while the size distribution of RLCA clusters is very broad.

The larger the cluster size, the faster their settling velocity. Therefore, aggregating particles sediment and this mechanism provides a way for separating them from suspension. At higher particle concentrations, the growing clusters may interlink, and form a particle gel. Such a gel is an elastic solid body, but differs from ordinary solids by having a very low elastic modulus.

== Homoaggregation versus heteroaggregation ==
When aggregation occurs in a suspension composed of similar monodisperse colloidal particles, the process is called homoaggregation (or homocoagulation). When aggregation occurs in a suspension composed of dissimilar colloidal particles, one refers to heteroaggregation (or heterocoagulation). The simplest heteroaggregation process occurs when two types of monodisperse colloidal particles are mixed. In the early stages, three types of doublets may form:
$$\begin{align}
\mathrm{A + A} &\longrightarrow \mathrm A_2 \\[2pt]
\mathrm{B + B} &\longrightarrow \mathrm B_2 \\[2pt]
\mathrm{A + B} &\longrightarrow \mathrm{AB}
\end{align}$$

While the first two processes correspond to homoaggregation in pure suspensions containing particles A or B, the last reaction represents the actual heteroaggregation process. Each of these reactions is characterized by the respective aggregation coefficients k_{AA}, k_{BB}, and k_{AB}. For example, when particles A and B bear positive and negative charge, respectively, the homoaggregation rates may be slow, while the heteroaggregation rate is fast. In contrast to homoaggregation, the heteroaggregation rate accelerates with decreasing salt concentration. Clusters formed at later stages of such heteroaggregation processes are even more ramified that those obtained during DLCA (d ≈ 1.4).

An important special case of a heteroaggregation process is the deposition of particles on a substrate. Early stages of the process correspond to the attachment of individual particles to the substrate, which can be pictures as another, much larger particle. Later stages may reflect blocking of the substrate through repulsive interactions between the particles, while attractive interactions may lead to multilayer growth, and is also referred to as ripening. These phenomena are relevant in membrane or filter fouling.

== Experimental techniques ==
Numerous experimental techniques have been developed to study particle aggregation. Most frequently used are time-resolved optical techniques that are based on transmittance or scattering of light.

Light transmission. The variation of transmitted light through an aggregating suspension can be studied with a regular spectrophotometer in the visible region. As aggregation proceeds, the medium becomes more turbid, and its absorbance increases. The increase of the absorbance can be related to the aggregation rate constant k and the stability ratio can be estimated from such measurements. The advantage of this technique is its simplicity.

Light scattering. These techniques are based on probing the scattered light from an aggregating suspension in a time-resolved fashion. Static light scattering yields the change in the scattering intensity, while dynamic light scattering the variation in the apparent hydrodynamic radius. At early-stages of aggregation, the variation of each of these quantities is directly proportional to the aggregation rate constant k. At later stages, one can obtain information on the clusters formed (e.g., fractal dimension). Light scattering works well for a wide range of particle sizes. Multiple scattering effects may have to be considered, since scattering becomes increasingly important for larger particles or larger aggregates. Such effects can be neglected in weakly turbid suspensions. Aggregation processes in strongly scattering systems have been studied with transmittance, backscattering techniques or diffusing-wave spectroscopy.

Single particle counting. This technique offers excellent resolution, whereby clusters made out of tenths of particles can be resolved individually. The aggregating suspension is forced through a narrow capillary particle counter and the size of each aggregate is being analyzed by light scattering. From the scattering intensity, one can deduce the size of each aggregate, and construct a detailed aggregate size distribution. If the suspensions contain high amounts of salt, one could equally use a Coulter counter. As time proceeds, the size distribution shifts towards larger aggregates, and from this variation aggregation and breakup rates involving different clusters can be deduced. The disadvantage of the technique is that the aggregates are forced through a narrow capillary under high shear, and the aggregates may disrupt under these conditions.

Indirect techniques. As many properties of colloidal suspensions depend on the state of aggregation of the suspended particles, various indirect techniques have been used to monitor particle aggregation too. While it can be difficult to obtain quantitative information on aggregation rates or cluster properties from such experiments, they can be most valuable for practical applications. Among these techniques settling tests are most relevant. When one inspects a series of test tubes with suspensions prepared at different concentration of the flocculant, stable suspensions often remain dispersed, while the unstable ones settle. Automated instruments based on light scattering/transmittance to monitor suspension settling have been developed, and they can be used to probe particle aggregation. One must realize, however, that these techniques may not always reflect the actual aggregation state of a suspension correctly. For example, larger primary particles may settle even in the absence of aggregation, or aggregates that have formed a colloidal gel will remain in suspension. Other indirect techniques capable to monitor the state of aggregation include, for example, filtration, rheology, absorption of ultrasonic waves, or dielectric properties.

== Relevance ==
Particle aggregation is a widespread phenomenon, which spontaneously occurs in nature but is also widely explored in manufacturing. Some examples include.

Formation of river delta. When river water carrying suspended sediment particles reaches salty water, particle aggregation may be one of the factors responsible for river delta formation. Charged particles are stable in river's fresh water containing low levels of salt, but they become unstable in sea water containing high levels of salt. In the latter medium, the particles aggregate, the larger aggregates sediment, and thus create the river delta.

Papermaking. Retention aids are added to the pulp to accelerate paper formation. These aids are coagulating aids, which accelerate the aggregation between the cellulose fibers and filler particles. Frequently, cationic polyelectrolytes are being used for that purpose.

Water treatment. Treatment of municipal waste water normally includes a phase where fine solid particles are removed. This separation is achieved by addition of a flocculating or coagulating agent, which induce the aggregation of the suspended solids. The aggregates are normally separated by sedimentation, leading to sewage sludge. Commonly used flocculating agents in water treatment include multivalent metal ions (e.g., Fe^{3+} or Al^{3+}), polyelectrolytes, or both.

Cheese making. The key step in cheese production is the separation of the milk into solid curds and liquid whey. This separation is achieved by inducing the aggregation processes between casein micelles by acidifying the milk or adding rennet. The acidification neutralizes the carboxylate groups on the micelles and induces the aggregation.

== See also ==
- Aerosol
- Colloid
- Clarifying agent
- Double layer forces
- DLVO theory (stability of colloids)
- Electrical double layer
- Emulsion
- Flocculation
- Gel
- Nanoparticle
- Particle deposition
- Peptization
- Reaction rate
- Settling
- Smoluchowski coagulation equation
- Sol-gel
- Surface charge
- Suspension (chemistry)
