= Surface forces apparatus =

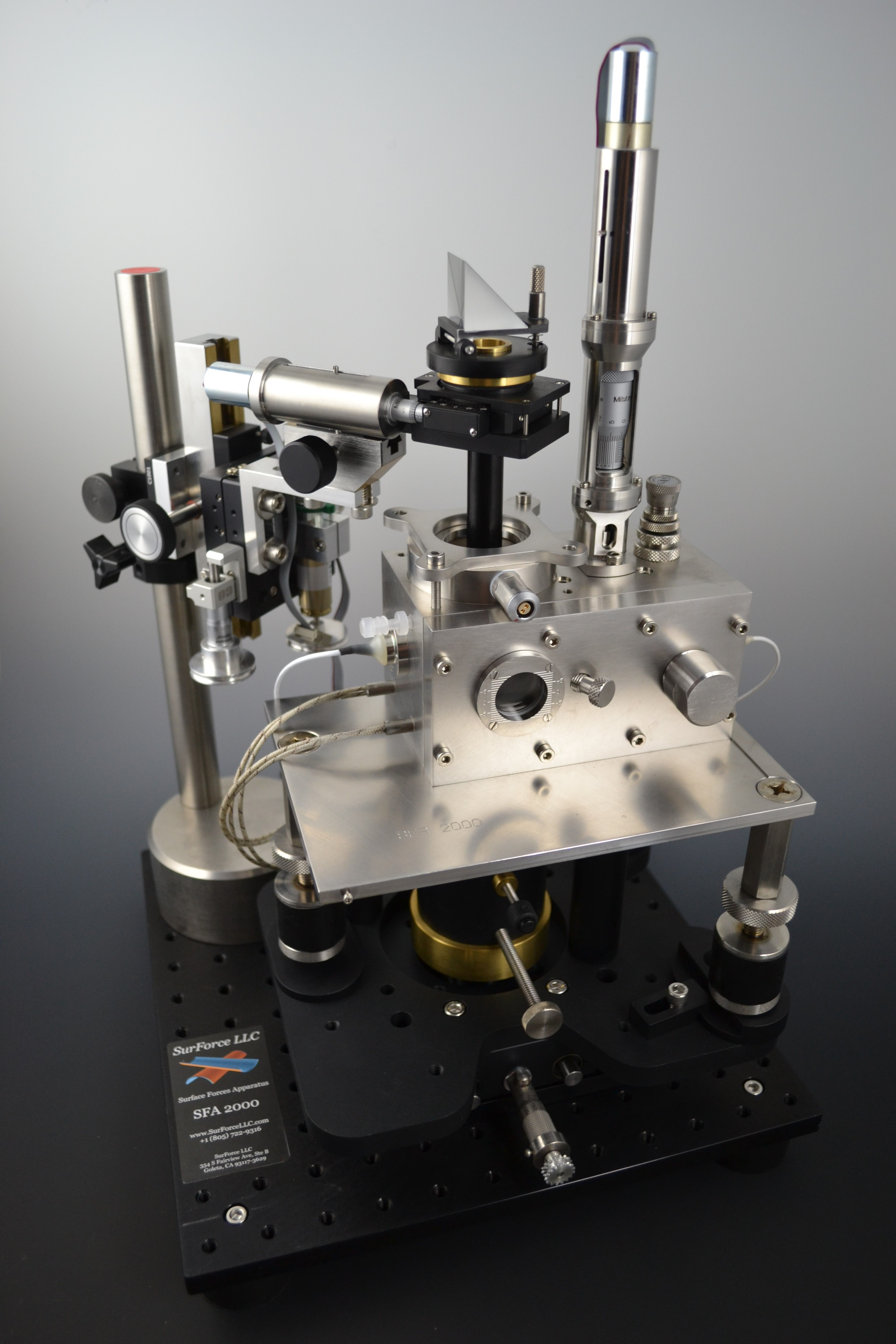
A current Surface Force Apparatus. The model shown is the SFA 2000.

The Surface Force Apparatus (SFA) is a scientific instrument which measures the interaction force of two surfaces as they are brought together and retracted using multiple beam interferometry to monitor surface separation and directly measure contact area and observe any surface deformations occurring in the contact zone. One surface is held by a cantilevered spring, and the deflection of the spring is used to calculate the force being exerted. The technique was pioneered by David Tabor and R.H.S. Winterton in the late 1960s at Cambridge University. By the mid-1970s, J.N. Israelachvili had adapted the original design to operate in liquids, notably aqueous solutions, while at the Australian National University, and further advanced the technique to support friction and electro-chemical surface studies while at the University of California Santa Barbara.

== Operation ==
A Surface Force Apparatus uses piezoelectric positioning elements (in addition to conventional motors for coarse adjustments), and senses the distance between the surfaces using optical interferometry. Using these sensitive elements, the device can resolve distances to within 0.1 nanometer, and forces at the 10^{−8} N level. This extremely sensitive technique can be used to measure electrostatic forces, elusive van der Waals forces, and even hydration or solvation forces. SFA is in some ways similar to using an atomic force microscope to measure interaction between a tip (or molecule adsorbed onto the tip) and a surface. The SFA, however, is more ideally suited to measuring surface-surface interactions, can measure much longer-range forces more accurately, and is well-suited to situations where long relaxation times play a role (ordering, high-viscosity, corrosion). The SFA technique is quite demanding, nevertheless, labs worldwide have adopted the technique as part of their surface science research instrumentation.

In the SFA, method two smooth cylindrically curved surfaces whose cylindrical axes are positioned at 90° to each other are made to approach each other in a direction normal to the axes. The distance between the surfaces at the point of closest approach varies between a few micrometers to a few nanometers depending on the apparatus. When the two curved cylinders have the same radius of curvature, R, this so-called 'crossed cylinders' geometry is mathematically equivalent to the interaction between a flat surface and a sphere of radius R. Using the crossed cylinder geometry makes alignment much easier, enables testing of many different surface regions for better statistics, and also enables angle-dependent measurements to be taken. A typical setup involves R = 1 cm.

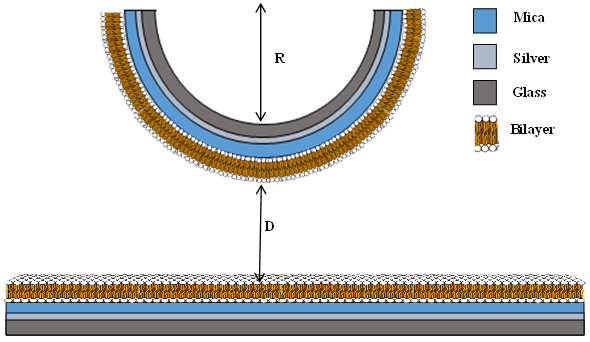
An example SFA setup showing the various layers, using a geometrically equivalent model.

Position measurements are typically made using multiple beam interferometry (MBI). The transparent surfaces of the perpendicular cylinders, usually mica, are backed with a highly reflective material, usually silver, before being mounted to the glass cylinders. When a white-light source is shined normal to the perpendicular cylinders, the light will reflect back and forth until it is transmitted at where the surfaces are closest. These rays create an interference pattern, known as fringes of equal chromatic order (FECO), which can be observed by microscope. Distance between the two surfaces can be determined by analyzing these patterns. Mica is used because it is extremely flat, easy to work with, and optically transparent. Any other material or molecule of interest can be coated or adsorbed onto the mica layer.

=== The jump method ===
In the jump method, the top cylinder is mounted to a pair of cantilever springs, while the bottom cylinder is brought up towards the top cylinder. While the bottom cylinder approaches the top, there comes a point when they will "jump" into contact with each other. The measurements, in this case, are based on the distance from which they jump and the spring constant. These measurements are usually between surfaces 1.25 nm and 20 nm apart.

=== The resonance method ===
The jump method is difficult to execute mainly due to unaccounted vibrations entering the instrument. To overcome this, researchers developed the resonance method which measured surface forces at larger distances, 10 nm to 130 nm. In this case, the bottom cylinder is oscillated at a known frequency, while the frequency of the top cylinder is measured using a piezoelectric bimorph strain gauge. To minimize the dampening due to the surrounding substance, these measurements were originally done in a vacuum.

=== Solvent mode ===
Early experiments measured the force between mica surfaces in air or vacuum. The technique has been extended, however, to enable an arbitrary vapor or solvent to be introduced between the two surfaces. In this way, interactions in various media can be carefully probed, and the dielectric constant of the gap between the surfaces can be tuned. Moreover, use of water as a solvent enables the measurement of interactions between biological molecules (such as lipids in biological membranes or proteins) in their native environment. In a solvent environment, SFA can even measure the oscillatory solvation and structural forces arising from the packing of individual layers of solvent molecules. It can also measure the electrostatic 'double layer' forces between charged surfaces in an aqueous medium with electrolyte.

=== Dynamic mode ===
The SFA has more recently been extended to perform dynamic measurements, thereby determining viscous and viscoelastic properties of fluids, frictional and tribological properties of surfaces, and the time-dependent interaction between biological structures.

== Theory ==
The force measurements of the SFA are based primarily on Hooke's law,

$F = kx$

where F is the restoring force of a spring, k is the spring constant and x is the displacement of the spring.

Using a cantilevered spring, the lower surface is brought towards the top surface using a fine micrometer or piezotube. The force between the two surfaces is measured by

$\Delta F(x)=k(\Delta x_{\text{applied}}-\Delta x_{\text{measured}})$

where $\Delta x_{\text{applied}}$ is the change in displacement applied by the micrometer and $\Delta x_{\text{measured}}$ is the change displacement measured by interferometry.

The spring constants can range anywhere from $30\times10^5 \frac{N}{m}$ to $5\times10^5 \frac{N}{m}$. When measuring higher forces, a spring with a higher spring constant would be used.

== See also ==
- Atomic force microscope
- Colloidal probe technique
