= Flocculation =

Particles coming out of suspension as flakes

IUPAC definition

Flocculation (in polymer science): Reversible formation of aggregates in which the particles are not in physical contact.

Agglomeration (except in polymer science)
Coagulation (except in polymer science)
Flocculation (except in polymer science)
Process of contact and adhesion whereby dispersed molecules or particles are held together by weak physical interactions ultimately leading to phase separation by the formation of precipitates of larger than colloidal size.

- In contrast to aggregation, agglomeration is a reversible process.
- The definition proposed here is recommended for distinguishing agglomeration from aggregation. The particles that comprise agglomerates can be dispersed again.
- This quotation is from the Purple Book (Compendium of Polymer Terminology and Nomenclature: IUPAC Recommendations, 2008).

4x speed video of floc settling after adding flocculant polymers during a jar test.

In colloidal chemistry, flocculation is a process by which colloidal particles come out of suspension to sediment in the form of floc or flake, either spontaneously or due to the addition of a clarifying agent. The action differs from precipitation in that, prior to flocculation, colloids are merely suspended, under the form of a stable dispersion (where the internal phase (solid) is dispersed throughout the external phase (fluid) through mechanical agitation) and are not truly dissolved in solution.

Coagulation and flocculation are important processes in fermentation and water treatment with coagulation aimed to destabilize and aggregate particles through chemical interactions between the coagulant and colloids, and flocculation to sediment the destabilized particles by causing their aggregation into floc.

== Term definition ==
According to the IUPAC definition, flocculation is "a process of contact and adhesion whereby the particles of a dispersion form larger-size clusters". Flocculation is synonymous with agglomeration and coagulation/coalescence.

Basically, coagulation is a process of addition of coagulant to destabilize a stabilized charged particle. Meanwhile, flocculation is a technique that promotes agglomeration and assists in the settling of particles. The most common used coagulant is alum, Al_{2}(SO_{4})_{3}·14H_{2}O.

The chemical reaction involved:

Al_{2}(SO_{4})_{3} · 14 H_{2}O → 2 Al(OH)_{3}(s) + 6 H^{+} + 3 SO^{2−}_{4} + 8 H_{2}O

During flocculation, gentle mixing accelerates the rate of particle collision, and the destabilized particles are further aggregated and enmeshed into larger precipitates. Flocculation is affected by several parameters, including mixing shear and intensity, time and pH. The product of the mixing intensity and mixing time is used to describe flocculation processes.

=== Jar test ===
The process by which the dosage and choice of flocculant are selected is called a jar test. The equipment used for jar testing consists of one or more beakers, each equipped with a paddle mixer. After the addition of flocculants, rapid mixing takes place, followed by slow mixing and later the sedimentation process. Samples can then be taken from the aqueous phase in each beaker.

== Mechanisms ==
One mechanism for flocculation is coacervation.

== Applications ==
=== Surface chemistry ===
In colloid chemistry, flocculation refers to the process by which fine particulates are caused to clump together into a floc. The floc may then float to the top of the liquid (creaming), settle to the bottom of the liquid (sedimentation), or be readily filtered from the liquid. Flocculation behavior of soil colloids is closely related to freshwater quality. High dispersibility of soil colloids not only directly causes turbidity of the surrounding water but it also induces eutrophication due to the adsorption of nutritional substances in rivers and lakes and even boats under the sea.

=== Physical chemistry ===
For emulsions, flocculation describes clustering of individual dispersed droplets together, whereby the individual droplets do not lose their identity. Flocculation is thus the initial step leading to further ageing of the emulsion (droplet coalescence and the ultimate separation of the phases). Flocculation is used in mineral dressing, but can be also used in the design of physical properties of food and pharmaceutical products.

=== Medical diagnostics ===
In a medical laboratory, flocculation is the core principle used in various diagnostic tests, for example the rapid plasma reagin test.

=== Civil engineering/earth sciences ===
In civil engineering, and in the earth sciences, flocculation is a condition in which clays, polymers or other small charged particles become attached and form a fragile structure, a floc. In dispersed clay slurries, flocculation occurs after mechanical agitation ceases and the dispersed clay platelets spontaneously form flocs because of attractions between negative face charges and positive edge charges.

=== Biology ===
Flocculation is used in biotechnology applications in conjunction with microfiltration to improve the efficiency of biological feeds. The addition of synthetic flocculants to the bioreactor can increase the average particle size making microfiltration more efficient. When flocculants are not added, cakes form and accumulate causing low cell viability. Positively charged flocculants work better than negatively charged ones since the cells are generally negatively charged.

=== Cheese industry ===
Flocculation is widely employed to measure the progress of curd formation in the initial stages of cheese making to determine how long the curds must set. The reaction involving the rennet micelles are modeled by Smoluchowski kinetics. During the renneting of milk the micelles can approach one another and flocculate, a process that involves hydrolysis of molecules and macropeptides.

Flocculation is also used during cheese wastewater treatment. Three different coagulants are mainly used:

- FeSO_{4} (iron(II) sulfate)
- Al_{2}(SO_{4})_{3} (aluminium sulfate)
- FeCl_{3} (iron(III) chloride)

=== Brewing ===
In the brewing industry flocculation has a different meaning. It is a very important process in fermentation during the production of beer where cells form macroscopic flocs. These flocs cause the yeast to sediment or rise to the top of a fermentation at the end of the fermentation. Subsequently, the yeast can be collected (cropped) from the top (ale fermentation) or the bottom (lager fermentation) of the fermenter in order to be reused for the next fermentation.

Yeast flocculation is partially determined by the calcium concentration, often in the 50-100ppm range. Calcium salts can be added to cause flocculation, or the process can be reversed by removing calcium by adding phosphate to form insoluble calcium phosphate, adding excess sulfate to form insoluble calcium sulfate, or adding EDTA to chelate the calcium ions. While it appears similar to sedimentation in colloidal dispersions, the mechanisms are different.

=== Water treatment process ===
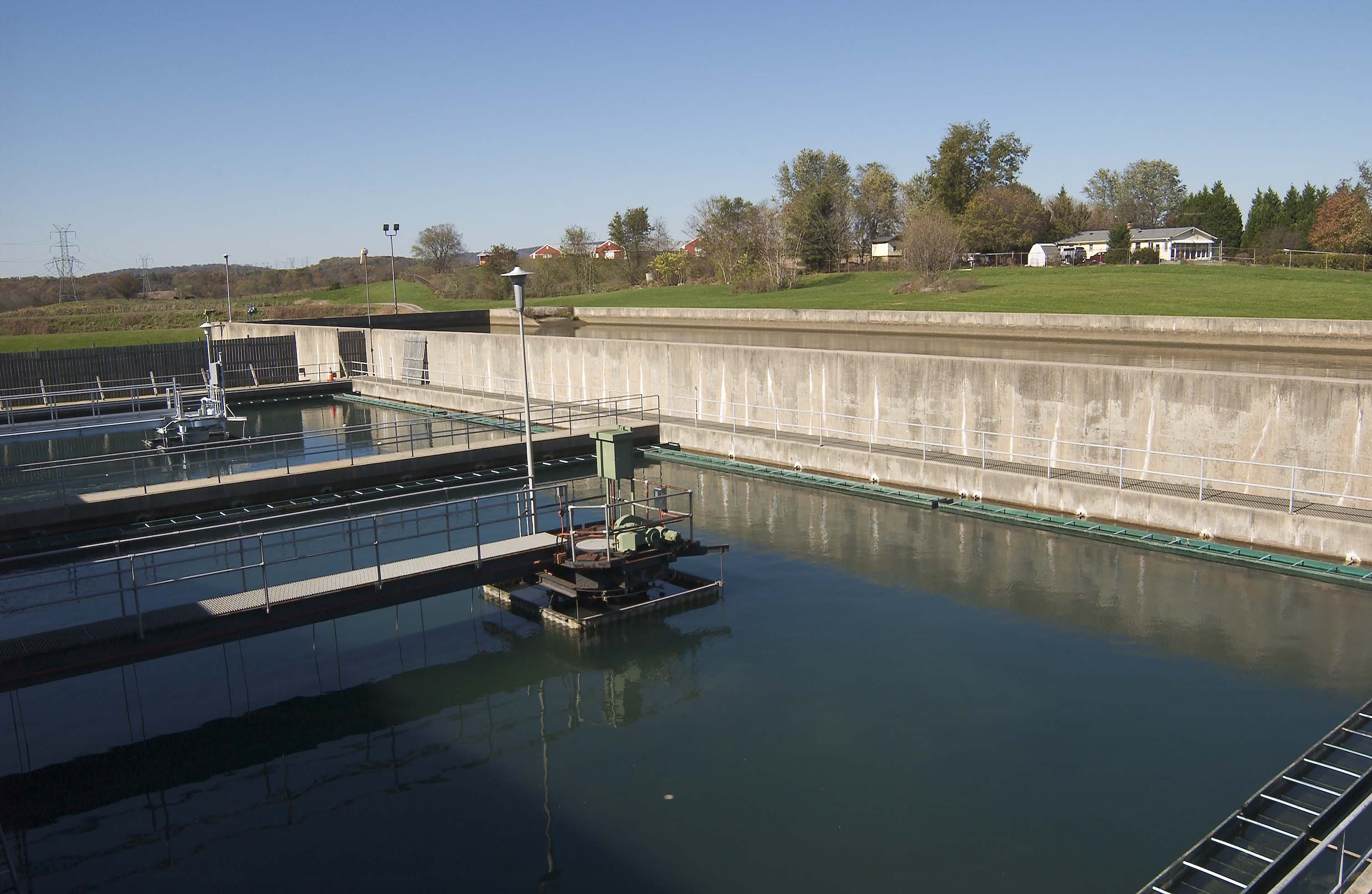
Coagulation-flocculation process in a water treatment system

Flocculation and sedimentation are widely employed in the purification of drinking water as well as in sewage treatment, storm-water treatment and treatment of industrial wastewater streams. For drinking water, typical treatment processes consist of grates, coagulation, flocculation, sedimentation, granular filtration and disinfection. The coagulation and flocculation steps are similar, causing particles to aggregate and fall out of solution, but may use different chemicals or physical movement of water. A variety of salts may be added to adjust the pH and act as clarifying agents, depending on the water chemistry. These include sodium hydroxide, calcium hydroxide, aluminum sulfate, aluminum oxide, ferric sulfate, ferric chloride, sodium aluminate, with flocculant aids polyaluminum chloride, polyferric chloride. A variety of cationic, anionic, and non-ionic polymers are also used, typically with a molecular weight below 500,000. Polydiallyldimethyl ammonium chloride (polyDADMAC) and epiDMA (a copolymer of epichlorohydrin and dimethylamine) are common choices, though these can produce carcinogenic nitrosamines. Sand, powerdered activated carbon, and clay may also be used as nucleating agents; in some cases, these are re-used after extraction.

Biopolymers, especially, chitosan, are increasingly popular as environmentally friendly flocculants. Chitosan is not only biodegradable but also exhibits a unique ability to bind with a wide range of contaminants, including heavy metals and organic pollutants, effectively removing them from water sources.

Flocculation provides promising results for removing fine particles and treating stormwater runoff from transportation construction projects, but are not used by most state departments of transportation in the U.S. This may be due to regulative restrictions or insufficient guidance for soil sampling requirements in light of changing soil characteristics. States that must achieve a numeric turbidity limit are more inclined to use flocculants to ensure the appropriate level of treatment.

== Deflocculation ==
Deflocculation is the opposite of flocculation, sometimes known as peptization. Sodium silicate (Na_{2}SiO_{3}) is a typical example. Usually, in higher pH ranges, in addition to low ionic strength of solutions and domination of monovalent metal cations, the colloidal particles can be dispersed. The additive that prevents the colloids from forming flocs is called a deflocculant. For deflocculation imparted through electrostatic barriers, the efficacy of a deflocculant can be gauged in terms of zeta potential. According to the Encyclopedic Dictionary of Polymers deflocculation is "a state or condition of a dispersion of a solid in a liquid in which each solid particle remains independent and unassociated with adjacent particles (much like emulsifier). A deflocculated suspension shows zero or very low yield value".

Deflocculation can be a problem in wastewater treatment plants, as it commonly causes problems with sludge settling and deterioration of the effluent quality.

== See also ==
- Algaculture – Aquaculture involving the farming of algae
- Clay–water interaction – Various progressive interactions between clay minerals and water
- Deposition (geology) – Natural addition of materials to a landmass
- Depletion force – Effective force in molecular and colloidal systems
- DLVO theory – Theoretical model for aggregation and stability of aqueous dispersions (stability of colloids)
- Drilling fluid, also known as drilling mud – Aid for drilling boreholes into the ground
- Isoelectric point – pH at which a molecule carries no net electric charge
- Lamella clarifier – Type of settler designed to remove particulates from liquids
- Particle aggregation – Clumping of particles in suspension
- Ostwald ripening – Process by which small crystals dissolve in solution for the benefit of larger crystals
- Seawater – Water from a sea or an ocean
- Smoluchowski coagulation equation – Population balance equation in statistical physics
- Soil structure – Arrangement of a soil's particles and pore spaces
- Syneresis (chemistry) – Extraction or expulsion of a liquid from a gel
