= Coalescence (chemistry) =

Process by which two phases merge to form a larger one with a lower total surface area

In chemistry, coalescence is a process in which two phase domains of the same composition come together and form a larger phase domain. In other words, the process by which two or more separate masses of miscible substances seem to "pull" each other together should they make the slightest contact.

IUPAC definition

Disappearance of the boundary between two particles in contact, or between a particle
and a polymer macrophase followed by changes of shape leading to a reduction of the
total surface area.

Note 1: Definition modified from that in ref.

Note 2: The coagulation of an emulsion, viz. the formation of aggregates, may be followed
by coalescence. If coalescence is extensive it leads to the breaking of an emulsion.
