= Impactor =

Impactor may refer to:

- A large meteoroid, asteroid, comet, or other celestial object which causes an impact event
- Impactor (Transformers), a fictional character
- Impactor (spacecraft), a craft designed for high-velocity landing
- Impact wrench, a power tool
- IMPACTors, former name of the Japanese band IMP.
- A device that uses aerosol impaction
  - Cascade impactor
    - Andersen sampler

== See also ==
- Impact (disambiguation)
- Impaction (disambiguation)
