= List of gaming miniatures companies =

This is a list of companies that have produced miniature models for tabletop games.

- Alternative Armies - Scottish company
- Archive Miniatures & Game Systems - Early producer of miniatures for role-playing games
- Asgard Miniatures - Early British company based in Nottingham
- Chronicle Figures - Early British company that produced role-playing game miniatures
- Black Powder Red Earth - Produces Modern war game miniatures and game. All USA made materials. https://www.blackpowderredearth.com/28mm.php
- Citadel Miniatures - Produces miniatures for Games Workshop games
- CMON Limited
- Dixon Miniatures - British company
- Essex Miniatures - British company
- Games Workshop - Has produced miniatures for its own games
- Grenadier Models Inc.
- Impact! Miniatures
- Mantic Games
- Martian Metals - Produced miniatures in the 1970s and 1980s for tabletop games
- Minifigs
- Privateer Press
- RAFM Company
- Ral Partha Enterprises
- Reaper Miniatures
- Torchlight Fantasy Products - British company active in the 1980s
- Wargames Factory
- WizKids
- Wyrd
