= Impaction =

Impaction may refer to:

- Impaction (animals), blockage of the digestive tract of animals
- Fecal impaction, a solid, immobile bulk of feces or indigestible matter that can develop in the rectum
- Dental impaction, the failure of a tooth fully to erupt into the mouth because of obstruction from another tooth
- Aerosol impaction

== See also ==
- Impact (disambiguation)
