= Aerosol mass spectrometry =

Application of mass spectrometry to aerosol particles

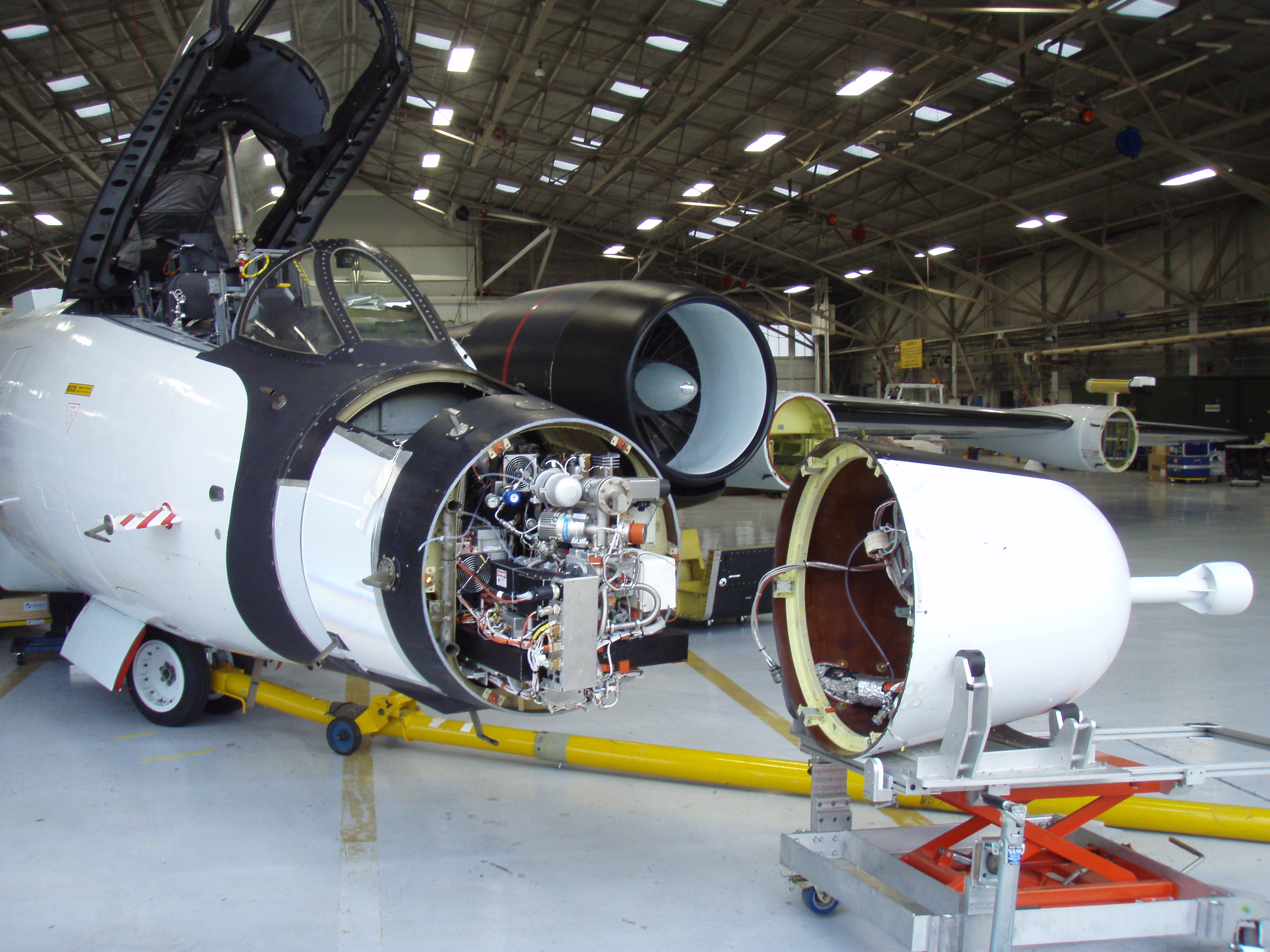
NOAA's Particle Analysis by Laser Mass Spectrometry instrument aboard the NASA WB-57 high-altitude research aircraft.

Aerosol mass spectrometry is the application of mass spectrometry to the analysis of the composition of aerosol particles. Aerosol particles are defined as solid and liquid particles suspended in a gas (air), with size range of 3 nm to 100 μm in diameter and are produced from natural and anthropogenic sources, through a variety of different processes that include wind-blown suspension and combustion of fossil fuels and biomass. Analysis of these particles is important owing to their major impacts on global climate change, visibility, regional air pollution and human health. Aerosols are very complex in structure, can contain thousands of different chemical compounds within a single particle, and need to be analysed for both size and chemical composition, in real-time or off-line applications.

Off-line mass spectrometry is performed on collected particles, while on-line mass spectrometry is performed on particles introduced in real time.

== History ==
In literature from ancient Rome there are complaints of foul air, while in 1273 the inhabitants of London were discussing the prohibition of coal burning to improve air quality. However, the measurement and analysis of aerosols only became established in the second half of the 19th century.

In 1847 Henri Becquerel presented the first concept of particles in the air in his condensation nuclei experiment and his ideas were confirmed in later experiments by Coulier in 1875. These ideas were expanded on between 1880 and 1890 by meteorologist John Aitken who demonstrated the fundamental role of dust particles in the formation of clouds and fogs. Aitken's method for aerosol analysis consisted of counting and sizing particles mounted on a slide, using a microscope. The composition of the particles was determined by their refractive index.

In the 1920s aerosol measurements, using Aitken's simple microscopic method, became more common place because the negative health effects of industrial aerosols and dust were starting to be recognized by health organizations. Technological and instrumentation advancements, including improved filters, led to improvement in the aerosol measurement methods in the 1960s. The introduction of polycarbonate filters, called nucleopore filters, enhanced the collection, storage, and transportation of samples without disturbing the physical and chemical state of the particles.

On-line aerosol measurements methods took a little longer than off-line to be developed and perfected. It wasn't till 1973 with W.D. Davis who developed and patented of the real-time single particle mass spectrometry (RTSPMS) instrument. The setup is quite similar to today's AMS system, with the sample being introduced through a small steel capillary into the ion source region. The sample would ionize after striking a hot rhenium filament. The resulting ions were separated in a magnetic sector and detected by an electron multiplier. The method could only ionize elements with ionization potentials below the work function of the filament (~8 eV), typically alkali and alkaline earth metal. The instrument did yield unit resolution up to a mass-to-charge ratio of 115. The RTSPMS instrument had a particle transmission/detection efficiency of 0.2-0.3%. Davis used the RTSPMS instrument to study samples from calibration aerosols, ambient laboratory air, and aerosols sources. Majority of his studies where focused on inorganic salts created in lab. In Davis's analysis of ambient air, he found a significant increase in lead at the end of the day, which was concluded to be due to automobile emissions. This development was the first step towards, today's modern on-line instruments.

The next major development in technological improvement that came out of the 1970s was in 1976 by Stoffel with the development of a magnetic sector RTSPMS technique that had a direct-inlet mass spectrometry (DIMS) also known as particle-inlet mass spectrometry (PIMS). The PIMS instrument was the first to have a deferentially-pumped direct inlet that consists of a stainless steel capillary, followed by a skimmer and conical collimator that focuses the sample into a particle beam that goes on to the ionization region. This type of inlet system is what modern on-line aerosol mass spectrometer instruments use today. In 1982 Sinha and Fredlander developed the particle analysis by mass spectrometry (PAMS), this method was the first to incorporate the optical detection of particles followed by laser desorption/ionization (LDI) in a RTSPMS technique. Prior to this point all RTSPMS methods used surface desorption/ionization (SDI) which consist of a heated metal that ionized the samples. The LDI method involves the sample being hit with a continuous wave, where the particle absorbs photons, and undergoes both desorption and ionization by the same pulse. LDI has several advantages over SDI for on-line single particle mass spectrometry, as such since its development it has been the primary ionization method for RTSPMS. The last major step in RTSPMS development was in 1994 by Kimberly A. Prather. Prather developed the aerosol time-of-flight mass spectrometry (ATOFMS), this method was the first that allow for simultaneous measurement of size and composition of single airborne particle. This techniques was different then previous methods in that instead of using the unreliable method of using light scattering signal intensity to measure particle size, this method uses a two laser system that allows for aerodynamic sizing.

== Off-line ==
Schematic of cascade impactor

Off-line is an older method than on-line and involves the chemical analysis of sampled aerosols collected traditionally on filters or with cascade impactors (shown to the right) in the field and analyzed back in the lab. Cascade impactors collects particles as they transverse a series of impaction plates, and separate them based on size. The aerosol samples are analyzed by the coupling of pre-separation methods with mass spectrometry. The benefit of this method relative to on-line sampling is greater molecular and structural speciation. The greater molecular and structural speciation is due to the pre-separation. There are many different types of instrumentation used for the analysis due to various type and combinations of the ionization, separation, and mass detection methods. Not one combination is best for all samples, and as such depending on the need for analysis, different instrumentation is used.

The most commonly used ionization method for off-line instrument is electron ionization (EI) which is a hard ionization technique that utilized 70 eV to ionize the sample, which causes significant fragmentation that can be used in a library search to identify the compounds. The separation method that EI is usually coupled with is gas chromatography (GC), where in GC the particles are separated by their boiling points and polarity, followed by solvent extraction of the samples collected on the filters. An alternative to solvent-based extraction for particulates on filters is the use of thermal extraction (TE)-GC/MS, which utilizes oven interfaced with the GC inlet to vaporize the analyte of the sample and into the GC inlet. This technique is more often used then solvent-based extraction, because of its better sensitivity, eliminates need for solvents, and can be fully automated. To increase the separation of the particles the GC can be coupled with a time of flight (TOF)-MS, which is a mass separation method that separates ions based on their size. Another method that utilizes EI is isotope ratio mass spectrometry (IR-MS) this instrumentation incorporates a magnetic sector analyzer and a faraday-collector detector array and separates ions based on their isotopic abundance. Isotopic abundance of carbon, hydrogen, nitrogen, and oxygen isotopic abundance become locally enriched or depleted through a variety of atmospheric processes. This information helps in determining the source of the aerosols and the interaction it has had.

EI is a universal ionization method, but it does cause excessive fragmentation, and thus can be substituted with chemical ionization (CI) which is a much softer ionization method, and is often used to determine the molecular ion. One ionization method the utilizes CI is atmospheric-pressure chemical ionization (APCI). In APCI the ionization occurs at atmospheric pressure with ions produced by corona discharges on a solvent spray, and it is often coupled with high-performance liquid chromatography (HPLC) which provides quality determination of polar and ionic compounds in the collected atmospheric aerosols. The use of APCI allows for the sampling of the filters without the need of solvents for the extraction. The APCI is typically connected to a quadruple mass spectrometer.

Other ionization methods are often used for off-line mass spectrometer inductively coupled plasma (ICP). ICP is commonly used in the elemental analysis of trace metals, and can be used to determine the source of the particles and their health effects.

There are also a range of soft ionisation techniques available for assessing the molecular composition of aerosol particles in greater detail, such as electrospray ionization, which result in less fragmentation of compounds within the aerosol. These techniques are only beneficial when coupled with a high or ultra-high resolution mass spectrometer, such as an FTICR-MS or an Orbitrap, as very high resolution is needed to differentiate between the high number of compounds present.

== On-line ==
On-line mass spectrometry was develop to solve some of the limitations and problem that develop from off-line analysis, such as evaporation and chemical reactions of particles in the filters during long analysis time. On-line Mass spectrometry solves these problems through the collection and analysis of aerosol particles in real time. On-line instruments are very portable and allow for spatial variability to be examined. These portable instruments can be put on many different platforms such as boats, planes, and mobile platforms (e.g. car trailers). An example of this is in the picture at the beginning with the instrumentation attached to an aircraft. Like off-line, on-line mass spectrometry has many different type of instruments, which can be broken up into two types; instruments that measures the chemistry of the particle ensemble (bulk measurement) and those that measure the chemistry of individual particles (single-particle measurement). Thus based on analytical need different instrumentation is used in analysis of the aerosol particles.

=== Bulk measurement ===
Generally speaking bulk measurement instruments thermally vaporize the particles prior to ionization, and there are several different ways that the vaporization and ionization is performed. The main instrument that is used for bulk measurements is Aerodyne aerosol mass spectrometer (AMS).

==== Aerosol mass spectrometer ====
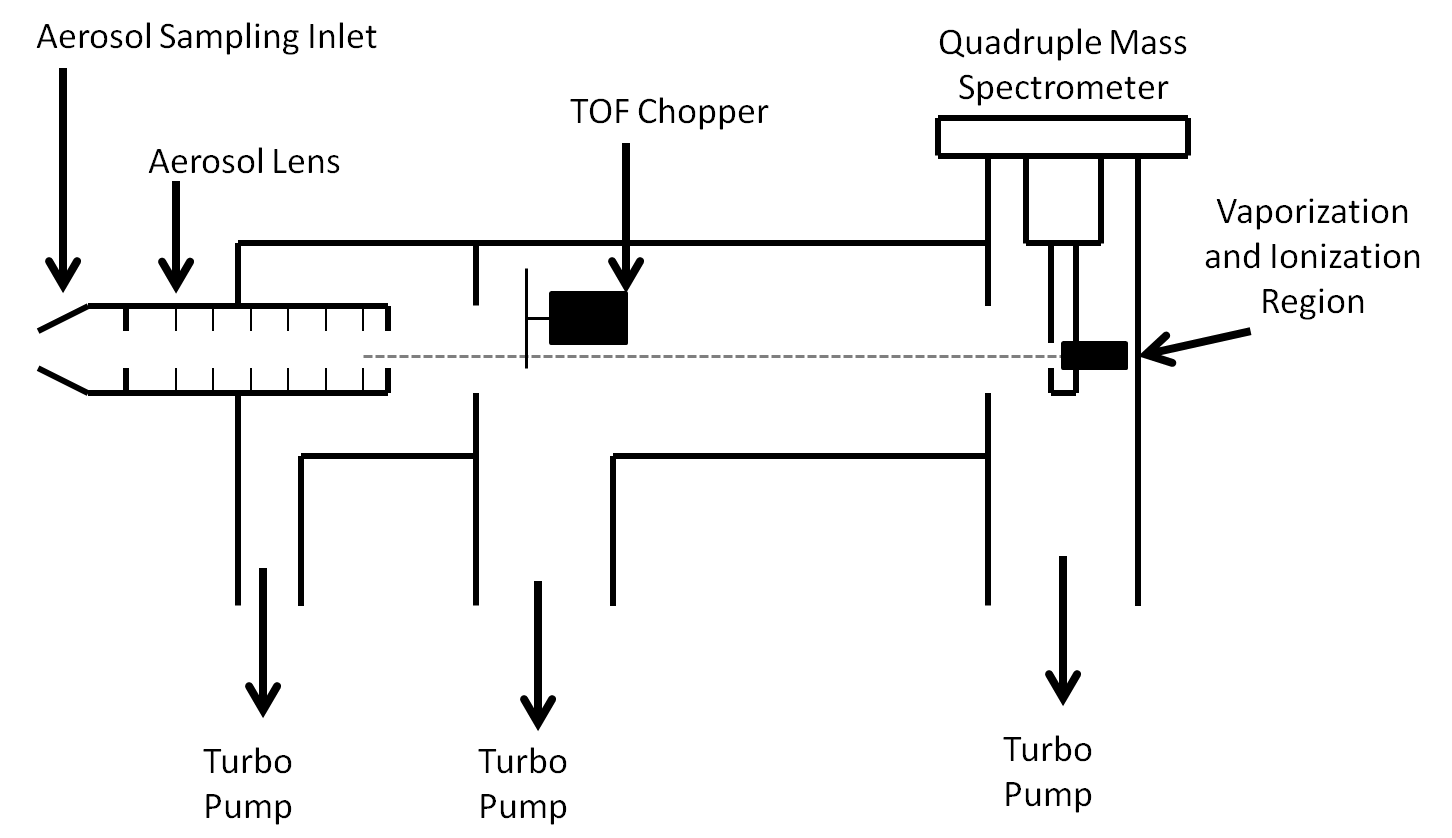
Schematic of the Aerodyne aerosol mass spectrometer (AMS)

The Aerodyne AMS provides real-time aerosol mass spectrometry analysis of size-resolved mass concentration of non-refractory components (Ex. organics, sulfate, nitrate, and ammonium). The term non-refractory is assigned to species that evaporate rapidly at 600 °C under vacuum conditions (e.g. organic matter, NH_{4}NO_{3} and (NH_{4})_{2}SO_{4}. The schematic of a typical AMS is shown in the figure to the right. The Aerodyne AMS is made up of three sections; The aerosol inlet, the particle sizing chamber, and the particle detection chamber. The aerosol inlet has a flow limiting orifice entrance that is around 100 um in diameter. Once in the chamber the sample goes through aerodynamic focusing lens system, which consist of several orifice lenses that are mount in sequence of decreasing inner diameter. The lens focuses the particles into a narrow particle beam.

The beam now travels through the particle sizing chamber, where the particle aerodynamic diameter is measured. The particle sizing chamber is made up of a flight tube maintained at (~ 10^{−5} torr). The entrance of the flight tube is a mechanical chopper that's used to modulate the particle beam; then using both the fixed length of the tube and the time-resolved detection of the arrival at the end, the particles' velocities can be determined. Using the velocity, the particle's diameter is obtained. As the particle beam exits the flight tube, it enters the particle composition detection chamber. In this section, the particles collide with a heated tungsten element (~600 °C). At this tungsten element the non-refractory components of the particle beam are flash vaporized and then ionized by EI. Once ionized, the sample can be analyzed with either a quadruple (Q), time-of-flight (ToF), or high-resolution (HR)-ToF mass analyzer.

=== Single-particle measurements ===
Generally speaking single-particle measurement instruments desorb particles one at a time using a pulsed laser. The process is called laser desorption/ionization (LDI) and is the primary ionization method used for single-particle measurements. The main advantage of using LDI over thermal desorption, is the ability to analyze both non-refractory and refractory (e.g., mineral dust, soot) components of atmospheric aerosols. Laser vaporization allows precise laser firing when individual particles fly through the vaporization zone, and the systems are thus dubbed single particle mass spectrometers (SPMS). Several versions of SPMS have been reported, including the aerosol time-of-flight mass spectrometer (AToFMS), the laser mass analyzer for particles in the airborne state (LAMPAS), particle analysis by laser mass spectrometer (PALMS), the rapid single-particle mass spectrometer (RSMS), the bioaerosol mass spectrometer (BAMS) b194 Steele et al., 2003), the nanoaerosol mass spectrometer (NAMS), the single-particle laser ablation time-of-flight mass spectrometer (SPLAT), the single-particle aerosol mass spectrometer (SPAMS), and laser ablation aerosol particle time-of-flight mass spectrometer (LAAP-ToF-MS). Among the most commons of these instruments is the aerosol time-of-flight mass spectrometer (AToFMS).

==== Aerosol time-of-flight mass spectrometer ====
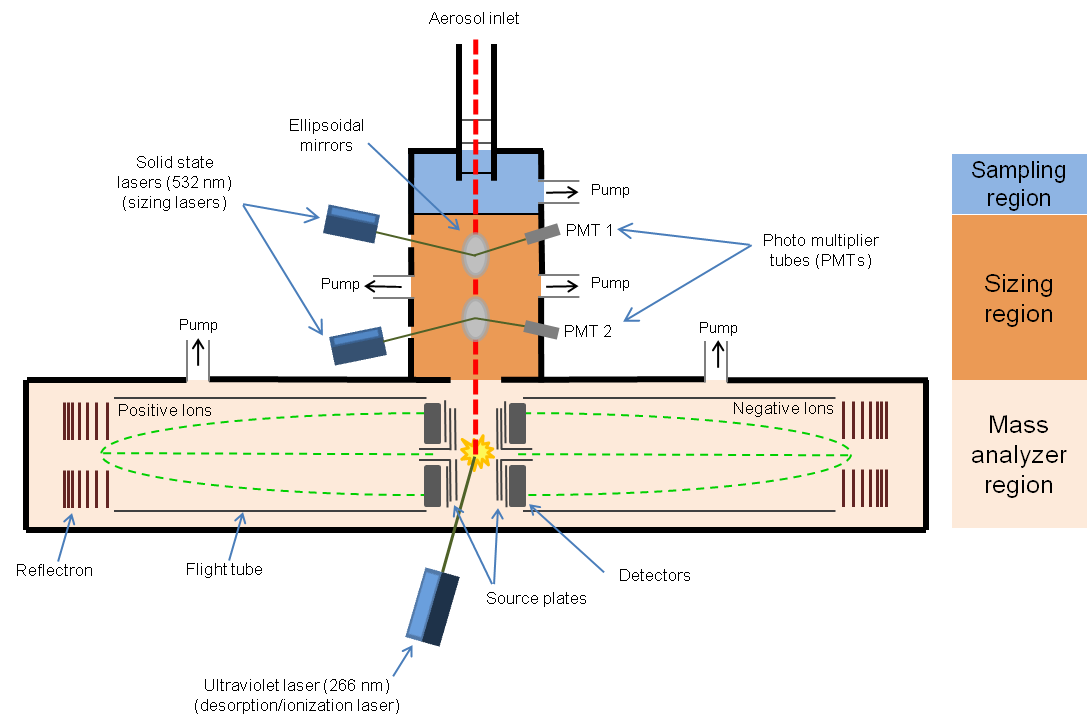
Schematic of aerosol time-of-flight mass spectrometer (ATOFMS)

The AToFMS allows for the determination of mixing state, or distribution of chemical species, within individual particles. These mixing states are important in the determination of climate and health impact of aerosols. The schematic of a typical AToFMS is shown to the right. The overall structure of ATOF instruments is; sampling, sizing, and the mass analyzer region. The inlet system is similar to the AMS by using the same aerodynamic focusing lens, but it has smaller orifices because of its analysis of single particles. In the sizing region particle passes through the first continuous solid state laser that generates an initial pulse of scattered light. Then the particle passes through the second laser that is orthogonal to the first and produces a pulse of scattered light. The light is detected by a photomultiplier (PMT) that is matched up to each laser. Using the transit times between the two detected pulses and the fixed distance the velocity and size of each particle is calculated. Next the particles travel through to the mass analyzer region where it is ionized by a pulsed LDI laser, which is timed to hit the particle as it reaches the center of the ion extraction region. Once ionized, the positive ions are accelerated towards the positive ToF section and the negative ions are accelerated towards the negative ToF section where they are detected.

== Applications ==
Aerosol science and measurements field, especially aerosol mass spectrometry has grown a lot over the last couple decades. Its growth is partly due to the instruments versatility, it has the ability to analyze a particles size and chemical composition, and perform bulk and single-particle measurements. The versatility of aerosol mass spectrometers allow for them to be used for many different applications in both the lab and field. Over the years aerosols mass spectrometers have been used for anything from determining emissions sources, human exposure to pollutants, radiative transfer and cloud microphysics. Most of these studies have utilized the mobility of the AMS and has been fielded in urban, remote, rural, marine, and forested environments around the world. AMS have also been deployed in mobile platforms such as ships, mobile laboratories, and aircraft.

One recent emission study in 2014 was performed by two NASA research aircraft, a DC-8 and a P-3B, that were outfitted with aerosol instrumentation (AMS). The aircraft were sent to perform analysis of atmospheric samples over the oil sands mining and upgrading facilities near Ft. McMurray, Alberta, Canada. The purpose of the study was to test the emission from the facilities, and determine if they match the requirements. The results of the study was that compared to estimates of annual forest fire emissions in Canada, the oil sands facilities are a minor source of aerosol number, aerosol mass, particulate organic matter, and black carbon.

Aerosol mass spectrometry has also found its way into the field of pharmaceutical aerosol analysis, due to its ability to provide real-time measurements of particle size and chemical composition. People who suffer from chronic respiratory disease commonly receive their medication through the use of either pressurized metered dose inhaler (pMDI) or dry powder inhaler (DPI). In both methods the drug is delivered directly into the lungs by inhalation. In recent years, inhaled products have become available which deliver two types of drug within a single dose. Research has shown that the two drugs inhalers provide an enhanced clinical effect beyond that achieved when the two drugs are administered concurrently from two separate inhalers. It was determined using an AToFMS that the respirable particles in a DPI product and pMDI product were composed of co-associated active pharmaceutical ingredients, which is the reason behind the increased effects of the two drug inhalers.

== See also ==
- Laser microprobe mass spectrometer
- Particulate matter sampler
- Aerosol impaction
- Particle size analysis
