= Impact =

Impact may refer to:

== Science, computing and technology ==
- Impact (mechanics), a large force or mechanical shock over a short period of time
- Impact (typeface), a sans-serif typeface
- Impact crater, a meteor crater caused by an impact event
- Impact evaluation, a way of evaluating changes from an intervention or development programme
- Impact event, the collision of a meteoroid, asteroid or comet with Earth
- Impact factor, a measure of the citations to a science or social science journal
- Impact wrench, a socket wrench power tool capable of high torque

== Arts and entertainment ==
=== Books and magazines ===
- Impact (novel), a 2010 novel by Douglas Preston
- Impact Press, a former Orlando, Florida-based magazine
- Impact Magazines, a former UK magazine publisher
- Impact magazine (Scientology), a Scientology publication
- Impact (conservative magazine), a British political magazine
- Impact (British magazine), a British action film magazine
- Impact, a French action film magazine spun off from Mad Movies
- Impact (UNESCO magazine), a former UNESCO quarterly titled IMPACT of science on society
- Impact (student magazine), a student magazine for the University of Nottingham, England
- Bathimpact, the student newspaper for the University of Bath Students' Union, England
- Impact Media, a social media company
- Vice Impact, a channel of Vice Media

=== Comics ===
- Impact Comics, a DC Comics imprint
- Impact (EC Comics), a 1955 EC Comics comic book
- Impact (Image Comics), an Image Comics comic book character

=== Film and television ===
- Impact (TV programme), a BBC World News weekday programme
- Impact (1949 film), a 1949 film noir starring Brian Donlevy and Ella Raines
- Impact (1963 film), a 1963 crime thriller starring Conrad Phillips
- Impact: Stories of Survival, a documentary television series on the Discovery Health Channel
- Impact (mini-series), a 2009 television mini-series starring Natasha Henstridge and David James Elliott
- Impact!, the flagship television broadcast of the American professional wrestling promotion Total Nonstop Action Wrestling
- Impact (2002 British TV series), a two-part British television miniseries
- "Impact" (Doctors), a 2003 television episode

=== Music ===
- Impact (1972 Charles Tolliver album), a live album by Charles Tolliver released on Enja Records
- Impact (1975 Charles Tolliver album), a studio album by Charles Tolliver released on Strata-East Records
- Impact (Eye Empire album)
- Impact, an album by thrash metal band Dew-Scented
- "Impact", single by Nettspend and Xaviersobased

== Businesses and organisations ==
- Impact Confections, a candy company founded in 1981
- Impact! Miniatures, a company producing 28mm wargaming figures
- Impact Records, an American record label
- Impact Records (California), a California record label in the 1960s
- Impact (record label), a New Zealand record label
- IMPACT International Multilateral Partnership Against Cyber Threats
- IMPACT, Irish Municipal, Public and Civil Trade Union
- IMPACT, Ironworker Management Progressive Action Cooperative Trust
- IMPACT (British organisation), a charity focusing on public and preventative interventions to stop preventable disability
- IMPACT (Canadian organization), a charity focusing on natural resources in conflict areas
- IMPACT (computer graphics), a 1995 computer graphics architecture for Silicon Graphics computer workstations

=== Sport ===
- CF Montréal, formerly known as the Montreal Impact, a team in Major League Soccer, the top tier of North American professional association football
- Montreal Impact (1992–2011), the predecessor to the above team that played in several second-level North American leagues during its history
- Impact Wrestling, a professional wrestling organization founded in 2002

== Other uses ==
- Impact, Texas, a town in Taylor County, Texas, US
- Impact (gamer) (born 1995), South Korean League of Legends player
- Impact (custom car), a custom-built 1934 Ford roadster

== See also ==
- Collision (disambiguation)
- Effect (disambiguation)
- Influence (disambiguation)
- Impactor (disambiguation)
- Impaction (disambiguation)
