= Jill S. Baron =

American ecologist

Jill Baron
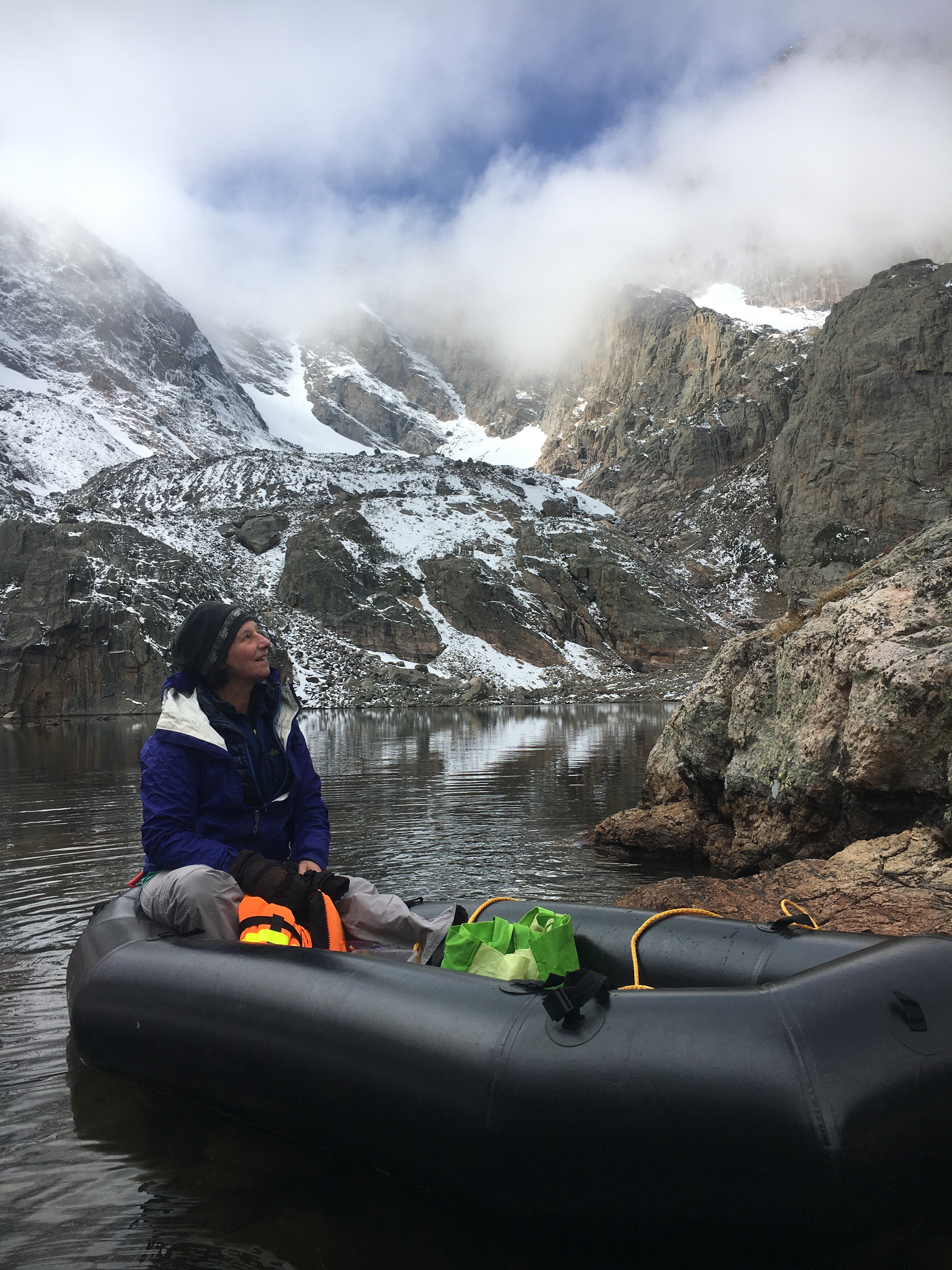
- Education: Ph.D. Colorado State University; M.S. University of Wisconsin; B.A. Cornell University
- Employer: United States Geological Survey
- Known for: Study of Atmospheric Nitrogen Deposition in Rocky Mountains
- Awards: U.S. Dept of Interior, Meritorious Service Award, 2002; Rocky Mountain Park Stewardship Award, 2011; Women of Vision Award, 2015

Jill S. Baron is an American ecosystem ecologist specializing in studying the effects of atmospheric nitrogen deposition in mountain ecosystems. She is a senior scientist at the United States Geological Survey and a senior research ecologist at the Natural Resource Ecology Laboratory at Colorado State University.

== Early life and education ==
Baron attended high school in Wisconsin and credited her involvement in ecology to her high school biology teacher, Mr. Lee. She states that Mr. Lee urged her class to explore nature in person and organized a trip every spring break with his students to study ecology in Georgia and Arizona. Baron went on to receive a bachelor's degree in plant sciences from Cornell University with a minor in geology in 1976. She got her master's degree from the University of Wisconsin Madison in land resources in 1979. Baron earned backing from the National Park Service during her masters work in the Gulf Islands National Seashore. Dr. Baron received a Ph.D. from Colorado State University in ecosystem ecology in 1991.

== Career and research ==
Baron started her career working part-time for the National Park Service throughout her master's degree. She was then hired to work full-time for the National Park Service in Washington D.C. and wrote a proposal to study acid rain in the rocky mountains; from 1981 on Baron worked on the rocky mountains. Now she studies atmospheric nitrogen deposition in mountain ecosystems through the biochemical and ecologic effects and how to manage ecosystems heavily influenced by humans.

Baron founded the John Wesley Powell Center at the United States Geological Survey as a subset for new synthesis and analysis. Baron started the Lock Vale Watershed in Rocky Mountain National Park and has served as principal investigator continuing the recording and research of the past thirty years.

Baron served as president of the Ecological Society of America in 2014 and remains a fellow. She was the editor-in-chief of "Issues in Ecology" from 2009 to 2012.

Baron is currently one of two women senior scientists for the United States Geological Survey. The USGS promoted Baron in 2015 after she worked as a research ecologist for 19 years. Out of the 9,000 employees of the USGS, fewer than 50 are named senior scientists. Baron is also a senior research ecologist at the Natural Resource Ecology Laboratory at Colorado State University. Over her career, Baron's research has informed policymakers on the changing nature of the Rocky Mountains, she testified in front of the House of Representatives Committee on Science on May 3, 2001 on atmospheric deposition in the western United States.

=== Publications ===
The following list is Baron's top publications and co-publications based on the number of citations in Google Scholar.

- Novel Ecosystems: Theoretical and Management Aspects of the New Ecological World Order
- Nitrogen Excess in North American Ecosystems: Predisposing Factors, Ecosystem Responses and Management Strategies
- Ecological Thresholds: The Key to Successful Environmental Management or an Important Concept with No Practical Application?
- Coupled Atmosphere–Biophysics–Hydrology Models for Environmental Modeling
- Ecological Effects of Nitrogen Deposition in the Western United States
- Meeting Ecological and Societal Needs for Freshwater
- DAYCENT and its Land Surface Submodel: Description and Testing
- Shifts in Lake N:P Stoichiometry and Nutrient Limitation Driven by Atmospheric Nitrogen Deposition
- Nitrogen Emissions, Deposition, and Monitoring in the Western United States
- Ecosystem Responses to Nitrogen Deposition in the Colorado Front Range

=== Public engagement and outreach ===
Baron is invested in forwarding women's role in science, highlighted by her 2015 "Women of Vision Award". She has mentored many female graduate students and acts as a role model through her many accomplishments. Baron talked on Women in Science stating, "All the common barriers you could think of still exist for women in the sciences" she continued saying, "It’s vital for women to take a strong role in scientific fields because we need all the brain power we can get to solve major environmental problems. Half the world’s population shouldn’t be excluded from those efforts." She remains engaged in advocating for women in science by working through the Ecology Society of America to help start Strategies for Ecology Education, Diversity, and Sustainability (SEEDS) programs at universities.

== Awards and honors ==
- U.S. Department of the Interior Meritorious Service Award for her years of ecosystem research at Lock Vale Watershed, 2002.
- Rocky Mountain Park Stewardship Award, 2011
- Intermountain Region Regional Director's Natural Resource Award, National Park Service, 2012
- named Woman of Vision by the Coloradan Women of Influence for her work on forwarding women's role in science, 2015
