= Coprolith =

Coprolith may mean:

- Coprolite, fossilised dung
- Fecaloma, a hardened piece of fæces, symptomatic of certain illnesses.
