= Turbophoresis =

Turbophoresis is the tendency for particles to migrate in the direction of decreasing turbulence level. The principle tends to segregate particles entrained in high velocity gases axially toward the wall region.

Caporaloni et al. (1975) first found that because the vertical gradient of turbulence near a depositing surface is large, turbophoresis is expected to enhance rate of particle deposition onto the surface. It was also predicted independently by Reeks (1983) who derived it rigorously from the particle kinetic equation and showed that it arose from a force balance between the net drag force and the gradient of the particle kinetic stresses acting on the particles due to the turbulence. He predicted that this would lead to a buildup of concentration near the wall, a feature which has been observed both experimentally and in Direct Numerical Simulation (DNS). He also independently called it turbophoresis.

Dasgupta et al., (1997) demonstrated that the non-uniform cross-sectional particle distribution observed during high-velocity flow of gas-particle mixtures through a vertical duct is indeed driven by turbophoresis.

Te et al. further found that the turbophoresis phenomenon inside mini-hydrocyclones can accelerate the radial migration of particles and droplets caused by centrifugal force, thereby achieving process intensification.
