= Kerri Pratt =

American chemist

- Education: University of California, San Diego; Pennsylvania State University
- Scientific career
- Workplaces: University of Michigan; Purdue University
- Thesis: New insights into single-particle mixing state using aircraft aerosol time-of-flight mass spectrometry (2009)
- Website: Pratt Lab

Kerri Pratt is an American chemist and Associate Professor of Chemistry at the University of Michigan. Her research considers atmospheric chemistry and how it impacts human health. She studies the interactions of atmospheric gases using mass spectrometry based techniques.

== Early life and education ==
Pratt was an undergraduate student at Pennsylvania State University, where she originally majored in environmental science but eventually switched to chemistry. She moved to the University of California, San Diego for graduate studies, where she worked toward a doctorate in time of flight mass spectrometry. Her doctoral research was supervised by Kimberly Prather. She was a postdoctoral researcher at Purdue University.

== Research and career ==
Pratt works in atmospheric chemistry. She was appointed to the faculty at the University of Michigan in 2013. She is interested in various chemical reactions that occur in the environment, including those that occur between trace gases, in aqueous solutions and on surfaces. Primary atmospheric particles can originate from natural and human-made sources, which include sea spray, soot and bacteria. These undergo various reactions and can form secondary atmospheric particles, evolving into dynamical chemical mixtures such as aerosols. These particles can take on a variety of different sizes, between 3 nm and 10 μm. Pratt investigates the interactions between trace gases and clouds using mass spectrometry. She is particularly interested in the atmospheric composition of winter environments, for example, in the Polar regions. The Arctic is undergoing a rapid loss of sea ice.

Pratt makes use of mass spectrometries to various degrees of sensitivity, for examples aerosol time-of-flight mass spectrometry (aerosols of 0.07 – 1.6 μm diameter), chemical ionization mass spectrometry (gases at sub parts per trillion) and ambient ion mass spectrometry. These results are combined with one-dimensional modelling to understand how atmospheric compositions as a function of altitude and time. She looks to establish the feedbacks between human-made emissions, aerosols and the Earth to better predict air quality. In 2018, she started a United States Department of Energy project to use single particle mass spectrometry during the Polar night. These measurements were combined with data collected from aerosol samples on the German icebreaker RV Polarstern.

== Awards and honors ==
- 2014 American Society for Mass Spectrometry Research Award
- 2018 American Chemical Society James J. Morgan ES&T Lectureship
- 2018 Eastern Analytical Symposium Young Investigator Award
- 2018 United States Department of Energy Early Career Award
- 2018 Analytical Scientist Top 40 under 40 Power List
- 2020 College of Literature, Science, and the Arts Class of 1923 Memorial Teaching Award
- 2021 American Meteorological Society Henry G. Houghton Award
- 2021 American Geophysical Union Atmospheric Sciences Ascent Award

== Selected publications ==
- Kerri A. Pratt; Paul J. DeMott; Jeffrey R. French; et al. (17 May 2009). "In situ detection of biological particles in cloud ice-crystals". Nature Geoscience. 2 (6): 398–401. doi:10.1038/ngeo521. ISSN 1752-0894. Wikidata Q58068690.
- Kerri A. Pratt; Kimberly A Prather (29 March 2011). "Mass spectrometry of atmospheric aerosols--recent developments and applications. Part II: On-line mass spectrometry techniques". Mass Spectrometry Reviews. 31 (1): 17–48. doi:10.1002/mas.20330. ISSN 0277-7037. PMID 21449003. Wikidata Q33449937.
- Kerri A. Pratt; Kyle D. Custard; Paul B. Shepson; et al. (14 April 2013). "Photochemical production of molecular bromine in Arctic surface snowpacks". Nature Geoscience. 6 (5): 351–356. doi:10.1038/ngeo1779. ISSN 1752-0894. Wikidata Q58654885.
