= Zoltán Füredi =

Hungarian mathematician

Zoltán Füredi (Budapest, Hungary, 21 May 1954) is a Hungarian mathematician, working in combinatorics, mainly in discrete geometry and extremal combinatorics. He was a student of Gyula O. H. Katona. He is a corresponding member of the Hungarian Academy of Sciences (2004). He is a research professor of the Rényi Mathematical Institute of the Hungarian Academy of Sciences, and a professor at the University of Illinois Urbana-Champaign (UIUC).

Füredi received his Candidate of Sciences degree in mathematics in 1981 from the Hungarian Academy of Sciences.

== Some results ==
- In infinitely many cases he determined the maximum number of edges in a graph with no C_{4}.
- With Paul Erdős he proved that for some c>1, there are c^{d} points in d-dimensional space such that all triangles formed from those points are acute.
- With Imre Bárány he proved that no polynomial time algorithm determines the volume of convex bodies in dimension d within a multiplicative error d^{d}.
- He proved that there are at most $O(n\log n)$ unit distances in a convex n-gon.
- In a paper written with coauthors he solved the Hungarian lottery problem.
- With Ilona Palásti he found the best known lower bounds on the orchard-planting problem of finding sets of points with many 3-point lines.
- He proved an upper bound on the ratio between the fractional matching number and the matching number in a hypergraph.
