= Kimberly Prather =

American scientist

Kimberly A. Prather
- Education: University of California, Davis, PhD
- Awards: National Academy of Engineering induction National Academy of Sciences induction
- Scientific career
- Workplaces: Scripps Institution of Oceanography; University of California, San Diego; University of California, Berkeley; University of California, Riverside
- Website: https://caice.ucsd.edu/kimberly-prather/

Kimberly A. Prather is an American atmospheric chemist. She is a distinguished chair in atmospheric chemistry and a distinguished professor at the Scripps Institution of Oceanography and department of chemistry and biochemistry at UC San Diego. Her work focuses on how humans are influencing the atmosphere and climate. In 2019, she was elected a member of the National Academy of Engineering for technologies that transformed understanding of aerosols and their impacts on air quality, climate, and human health. In 2020, she was elected as a member of the National Academy of Sciences. She is also an elected Fellow of the American Philosophical Society, American Geophysical Union, the American Association for the Advancement of Science, American Philosophical Society, and the American Academy of Arts and Sciences.

== Education and early career ==
Prather was born in Santa Rosa, California. She studied at Santa Rosa Junior College and University of California, Davis, earning a bachelor's degree in 1985 and a PhD in 1990. She served as a postdoctoral fellow at the University of California, Berkeley between 1990 and 1992, working with Nobel Laureate Yuan T. Lee. Prather joined University of California, Riverside as an assistant professor in 1992. During her time at UC Riverside she began to work on aerosol mass spectrometry, developing ways to make it compact and transportable. She patented the technology.

== Research ==
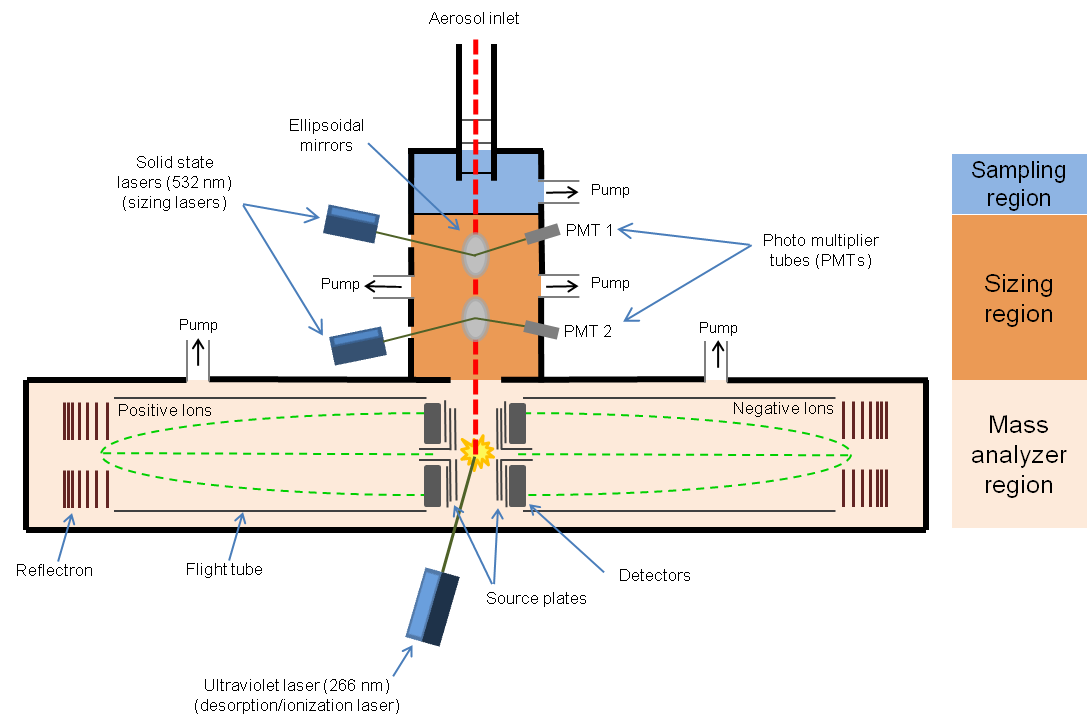
Schematic of aerosol time-of-flight mass spectrometer (ATOFMS)

In 2001, Prather joined the faculty at the University of California, San Diego as a member of the Department of Chemistry and Biochemistry and Scripps Institution of Oceanography. Prather's early research focused on determining the major sources of fine particle pollution in California as well as in the Northeastern United States. As part of this research, she explored methods to distinguish between different aerosol sources based on their single particle composition and size. She developed aerosol time-of-flight mass spectrometry (ATOFMS), a technique with high temporal and size resolution. In 1999 she began to work with the University of Rochester studying the health effects of ultrafine particles. She refined the detection technique so that it would precisely measure the size and composition of small particles. The ultrafine ATOFMS was able to examine exhaust particles from gasoline and diesel powered vehicles. She found that alongside the freeway, particles between 50 and 300 nm were mainly due to heavy-duty vehicles (51%) and light-duty vehicles (32%). She used the ultrafine ATOFMS to study atmospheric composition, combining it with ozone and NOx measurements. ATOFMS is now widely used in atmospheric studies around the world.

In 2003, she joined the advisory board of United States Environmental Protection Agency PM2.5 Clean Air. Between 2003 and 2006 Prather studied whether ATOFMS could be used to measure the carbonaceous components of aerosols (including PAHs) and help to understand atmospheric processes, distinguishing between organic (OC) and elemental carbon (EC). Prather showed it was possible to distinguish EC and OC on a single particle level, and investigated their chemical associations with ammonium, nitrate, and sulfate. Her group explored ways to calibrate the ATOFMS data, making real-time apportionment of ambient particles possible. They did this by classifying particles using an artificial neural network (ART-2a). In 2008 she became the co-lead scientist in CalWater in collaboration with F. Martin Ralph; a multi-year interdisciplinary research effort focusing on how aerosols are impacting the water supply in the West Coast of the United States. Her PhD student Kerri Pratt led the Ice in Clouds Experiment - Layer Clouds (ICE-L) study. ICE-L included the first aircraft ATOFMS, named Shirley. Pratt and Prather studied ice crystals in situ on high speed aircraft flying above Wyoming, and found that the particles were mainly composed of dust or biological particles (bacteria, fungal spores or plants). Understanding the composition of airborne particles is imperative to properly evaluate their impact on climate change, as well as provide insight into how aerosol impact cloud formation and precipitation.

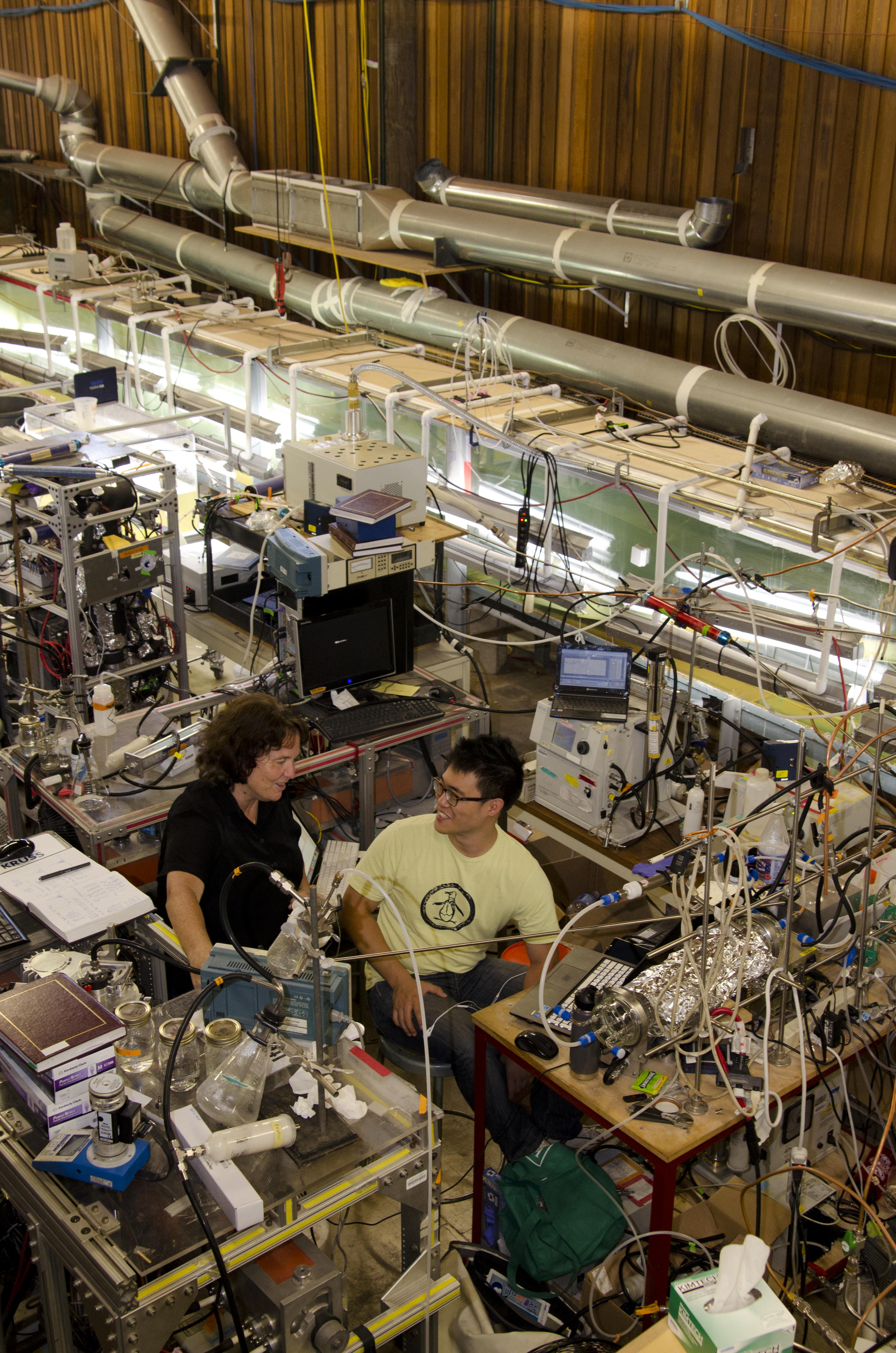
CAICE Director Kimberly Prather talks to her graduate student (Christopher Lee) in the Hydraulics Lab at Scripps Institution of Oceanography during IMPACTS 2014.

In 2010 she became the founding director of the NSF Center for Aerosol Impacts on Climate and the Environment (CAICE). CAICE became a National Science Foundation Phase II Center for Chemical Innovation in 2013. In this role, Prather develops new analytical techniques for studying aerosol chemistry. Her group demonstrated that dust and bioaerosols that travel from as far away as the Sahara can enhance precipitation in Western United States. Prather's group is studying the microbes that transfer from the ocean, become airborne and contribute to the global temperature. Ocean-in-the lab experiments are conducted by transferring thousands of gallons of seawater from the Pacific Ocean, producing waves, and adding nutrients to induce the growth of microbes. As part of CAICE, her group was the first to identify the major factors controlling chemical composition of sea spray, finding that the characteristics depended on the physical forces and ocean biology of the waves. They demonstrated two types of droplets; "film" drops that were full of microbes and organic materials, and "jet" drops that mainly contained sea salt and other biological species. Prather's research team can now explore the impact of carbon dioxide on the global temperature by controlling the amount entering their ocean simulation chamber. The Scripps Ocean Atmosphere Research Simulator (SOARS) became operational in the summer of 2022 and is being used to study how wind, temperature, sunlight and pollution impact the ocean and atmosphere. CAICE funding was extended by the National Science Foundation in 2018, with a second $20 million grant allowing them to investigate the interaction of human pollution with ocean-produced gases and aerosols.

Prather received the 2024 National Academy of Sciences Award in Chemical Sciences for her work furthering the understanding of atmospheric aerosols and their impact on air quality, climate, and human health.

== Awards and honors ==
- 1994 American Society for Mass Spectrometry Research Award
- 1994 National Science Foundation Young Investigator
- 1997 National Science Foundation Special Creativity Award
- 1998 Gesellschaft für Aerosolforschung Smoluchowski Award
- 1999 American Association for Aerosol Research Kenneth T. Whitby Award
- 2000 ACS Analytical Chemistry Arthur F. Findeis Award
- 2009 UCSD Faculty Sustainability Award
- 2009 American Association for the Advancement of Science Fellow
- 2010 American Geophysical Union Fellow
- 2010 American Academy of Arts and Sciences Fellow
- 2010 ACS Creative Advances in Environmental Science and Technology
- 2011 ACS San Diego Distinguished Scientist Award
- 2015 California Air Resources Board Haagen-Smit Clean Air Award
- 2018 UC San Diego Chancellor’s Associates Excellence Award in Research in Science and Engineering
- 2019 Elected to the National Academy of Engineering
- 2020 ACS Frank H. Field and Joe L. Franklin Award for Outstanding Achievement in Mass Spectrometry
- 2020 Elected to the National Academy of Sciences
- 2022 Elected to the American Philosophical Society
- 2022 Pittsburgh Analytical Chemistry Award
- 2023 Gustavus John Esselen Award for Chemistry in the Public Interest
- 2023 Analytical Scientist the Power list - Leaders and Advocates
- 2024 National Academy of Sciences Award in Chemical Sciences
- 2024 Analytical Scientist the Power List - Planet Protectors
