= Impaction (animals) =

Blockage of the intestines

Impaction is bowel obstruction that can occur in various kinds of animals when they consume something which they cannot digest, typically substrate. Once the substance is ingested, it will block the digestive tract and, if untreated, cause death.

== Symptoms ==
Some symptoms include a lack of appetite or lethargy. On many reptiles, a large blue seemingly bruised spot will be visible in the abdomen. However, this only shows through if the skin on the species is clear enough to see the lower internal organs.

== Treatment ==
Common treatments involve placing the reptile in a tepid bath and gently rubbing the area under the impaction to help the passing of the consumed substance. Place both thumbs on the back at the middle, put the first two fingers of the hand under the belly and rub gently in a circular motion until the reptile defecates. If this fails, the animal must have an enema.

== See also ==
- Aerosol impaction
- Fecal impaction
- Horse impaction
