= Random sequential adsorption =

Process in materials science

Random sequential adsorption (RSA) refers to a process where particles are randomly introduced in a system, and if they do not overlap any previously adsorbed particle, they adsorb and remain fixed for the rest of the process. RSA can be carried out in computer simulation, in a mathematical analysis, or in experiments. It was first studied by one-dimensional models: the attachment of pendant groups in a polymer chain by Paul Flory, and the car-parking problem by Alfréd Rényi. Other early works include those of Benjamin Widom. In two and higher dimensions many systems have been studied by computer simulation, including in 2d, disks, randomly oriented squares and rectangles, aligned squares and rectangles, various other shapes, etc.

An important result is the maximum surface coverage, called the saturation coverage or the packing fraction. On this page we list that coverage for many systems.

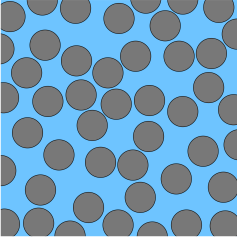
Saturation in the random sequential adsorption (RSA) of circular disks.

The blocking process has been studied in detail in terms of the random sequential adsorption (RSA) model. The simplest RSA model related to deposition of spherical particles considers irreversible adsorption of circular disks. One disk after another is placed randomly at a surface. Once a disk is placed, it sticks at the same spot, and cannot be removed. When an attempt to deposit a disk would result in an overlap with an already deposited disk, this attempt is rejected. Within this model, the surface is initially filled rapidly, but the more one approaches saturation the slower the surface is being filled. Within the RSA model, saturation is sometimes referred to as jamming. For circular disks, saturation occurs at a coverage of 0.547. When the depositing particles are polydisperse, much higher surface coverage can be reached, since the small particles will be able to deposit into the holes in between the larger deposited particles. On the other hand, rod like particles may lead to much smaller coverage, since a few misaligned rods may block a large portion of the surface.

For the one-dimensional parking-car problem, Renyi has shown that the maximum coverage is equal to

$\theta_1 = \int_0^\infty \exp\left(-2 \int_0^x \frac{1-e^{-y}}{y} dy \right) dx = 0.7475979202534\ldots$

the so-called Renyi car-parking constant.

Then followed the conjecture of Ilona Palásti, who proposed that the coverage of d-dimensional aligned squares, cubes and hypercubes is equal to θ_{1}^{d}. This conjecture led to a great deal of work arguing in favor of it, against it, and finally computer simulations in two and three dimensions showing that it was a good approximation but not exact. The accuracy of this conjecture in higher dimensions is not known.

For $k$-mers on a one-dimensional lattice, we have for the fraction of vertices covered,

$\theta_k = k \int_0^\infty \exp\left(-u - 2 \sum_{j=1}^{k-1} \frac{1-e^{-j u}}{j} \right) du = k \int_0^1 \exp\left(- 2 \sum_{j=1}^{k-1} \frac{1-v^j}{j} \right) dv$

When $k$ goes to infinity, this gives the Renyi result above. For k = 2, this gives the Flory result $\theta_1 = 1 - e^{-2}$.

For percolation thresholds related to random sequentially adsorbed particles, see Percolation threshold.

RSA of needles (infinitely thin line segments). This shows a dense stage although here saturation never occurs.

== Saturation coverage of k-mers on 1d lattice systems ==
system	Saturated coverage $\theta_k$(fraction of sites filled)
dimers	$1 - e^{-2} = 0.86466472$
trimers	$\frac{3 \sqrt{\pi } (\text{erfi}(2)-\text{erfi}(1))}{2 e^4} \approx 0.82365296$
k = 4	$0.80389348$
k = 10	$0.76957741$
k = 100	$0.74976335$
k = 1000	$0.74781413$
k = 10000	$0.74761954$
k = 100000	$0.74760008$
k = $\infty$	$0.74759792$

Asymptotic behavior: $\theta_k \sim \theta_\infty + 0.2162/k + \ldots$ .

== Saturation coverage of segments of two lengths on a one dimensional continuum ==
R = size ratio of segments. Assume equal rates of adsorption

system	Saturated coverage $\theta$(fraction of line filled)
R = 1	0.74759792
R = 1.05	0.7544753(62)
R = 1.1	0.7599829(63)
R = 2	0.7941038(58)

== Saturation coverage of k-mers on a 2d square lattice ==
system	Saturated coverage $\theta_k$(fraction of sites filled)
dimers k = 2	0.906820(2), 0.906, 0.9068, 0.9062, 0.906, 0.905(9), 0.906, 0.906823(2),
trimers k = 3	0.846, 0.8366
k = 4	0.8094 0.81
k = 5	0.7868
k = 6	0.7703
k = 7	0.7579
k = 8	0.7479, 0.747
k = 9	0.7405
k = 16	0.7103, 0.71
k = 32	0.6892, 0.689, 0.6893(4)
k = 48	0.6809(5),
k = 64	0.6755, 0.678, 0.6765(6)
k = 96	0.6714(5)
k = 128	0.6686, 0.668(9), 0.668 0.6682(6)
k = 192	0.6655(7)
k = 256	0.6628 0.665, 0.6637(6)
k = 384	0.6634(6)
k = 512	0.6618, 0.6628(9)
k = 1024	0.6592
k = 2048	0.6596
k = 4096	0.6575
k = 8192	0.6571
k = 16384	0.6561
k = ∞	0.660(2), 0.583(10),

Asymptotic behavior: $\theta_k \sim \theta_\infty + \ldots$ .

== Saturation coverage of k-mers on a 2d triangular lattice ==
system	Saturated coverage $\theta_k$(fraction of sites filled)
dimers k = 2	0.9142(12),
k = 3	0.8364(6),
k = 4	0.7892(5),
k = 5	0.7584(6),
k = 6	0.7371(7),
k = 8	0.7091(6),
k = 10	0.6912(6),
k = 12	0.6786(6),
k = 20	0.6515(6),
k = 30	0.6362(6),
k = 40	0.6276(6),
k = 50	0.6220(7),
k = 60	0.6183(6),
k = 70	0.6153(6),
k = 80	0.6129(7),
k = 90	0.6108(7),
k = 100	0.6090(8),
k = 128	0.6060(13),

== Saturation coverage for particles with neighbors exclusion on 2d lattices ==
system	Saturated coverage $\theta_k$(fraction of sites filled)
Square lattice with NN exclusion	0.3641323(1), 0.36413(1), 0.3641330(5),
Honeycomb lattice with NN exclusion	0.37913944(1), 0.38(1), 0.379

.

== Saturation coverage of $k \times k$ squares on a 2d square lattice ==
system	Saturated coverage $\theta_k$(fraction of sites filled)
k = 2	0.74793(1), 0.747943(37), 0.749(1),
k = 3	0.67961(1), 0.681(1),
k = 4	0.64793(1), 0.647927(22) 0.646(1),
k = 5	0.62968(1) 0.628(1),
k = 8	0.603355(55) 0.603(1),
k = 10	0.59476(4) 0.593(1),
k = 15	0.583(1),
k = 16	0.582233(39)
k = 20	0.57807(5) 0.578(1),
k = 30	0.574(1),
k = 32	0.571916(27)
k = 50	0.56841(10)
k = 64	0.567077(40)
k = 100	0.56516(10)
k = 128	0.564405(51)
k = 256	0.563074(52)
k = 512	0.562647(31)
k = 1024	0.562346(33)
k = 4096	0.562127(33)
k = 16384	0.562038(33)

For k = ∞, see "2d aligned squares" below. Asymptotic behavior: $\theta_k \sim \theta_\infty + 0.316/k + 0.114/k^2 \ldots$ . See also

== Saturation coverage for randomly oriented 2d systems ==
system	Saturated coverage
equilateral triangles	0.52590(4)
squares	0.523-0.532, 0.530(1), 0.530(1), 0.52760(5)
regular pentagons	0.54130(5)
regular hexagons	0.53913(5)
regular heptagons	0.54210(6)
regular octagons	0.54238(5)
regular enneagons	0.54405(5)
regular decagons	0.54421(6)

== 2d oblong shapes with maximal coverage ==
system	aspect ratio	Saturated coverage
rectangle	1.618	0.553(1)
dimer	1.5098	0.5793(1)
ellipse	2.0	0.583(1)
spherocylinder	1.75	0.583(1)
smoothed dimer	1.6347	0.5833(5)

== Saturation coverage for 3d systems ==
system	Saturated coverage
spheres	0.3841307(21), 0.38278(5), 0.384(1)
randomly oriented cubes	0.3686(15), 0.36306(60)
randomly oriented cuboids 0.75:1:1.3	0.40187(97),

== Saturation coverages for disks, spheres, and hyperspheres ==
system	Saturated coverage
2d disks	0.5470735(28), 0.547067(3), 0.547070, 0.5470690(7), 0.54700(6), 0.54711(16), 0.5472(2), 0.547(2), 0.5479,
3d spheres	0.3841307(21), 0.38278(5), 0.384(1)
4d hyperspheres	0.2600781(37), 0.25454(9),
5d hyperspheres	0.1707761(46), 0.16102(4),
6d hyperspheres	0.109302(19), 0.09394(5),
7d hyperspheres	0.068404(16),
8d hyperspheres	0.04230(21),

== Saturation coverages for aligned squares, cubes, and hypercubes ==
system	Saturated coverage
2d aligned squares	0.562009(4), 0.5623(4), 0.562(2), 0.5565(15), 0.5625(5), 0.5444(24), 0.5629(6), 0.562(2),
3d aligned cubes	0.4227(6), 0.42(1), 0.4262, 0.430(8), 0.422(8), 0.42243(5)
4d aligned hypercubes	0.3129, 0.3341,

== See also ==
- Adsorption
- Particle deposition
- Percolation threshold
