= Andersen sampler =

Cascade impactor that measures viable bioaerosols

Andersen's schematic for the six-stage Andersen sampler, detailing movement of air and hole sizes for the top two stages

An Andersen sampler, Andersen impactor, or sieve impactor is a cascade impactor used to determine the amount of viable pathogens in a given area, in particular bacteria and fungi. Unlike real-time electronic particle counters, the Andersen sampler imparts pathogens on petri dishes, which require incubation. Thus, calculation of the contaminated air requires working backwards from the resulting pathogen growth in each dish.

Andersen samplers have been used to assess the nature of pathogenic aerosols in various scientific papers. It can also be used to study inert aerosols, when each stage of the sampler is used to model respiratory particle deposition.

== Operation ==
Andersen's paper from 1958 describes a six-stage Andersen sampler that counts "viable airborne particles". In each stage, air goes through specifically sized holes, past a petri dish that aerosols impact, before subsequently moving through smaller holes towards the other petri dishes. Each stage gradually increases the velocity of the air; the sampler relies on inertia for particles to leave the air stream.

The hole pattern can be used to quantify viable particles, without a microscope, under the "positive hole method".

Calculation of the number of viable particles is normally done by counting colonies via a microscope, called the "microscope method" in Andersen's paper. For stages 3 through 6, Andersen provides an alternate means of calculating viable particles via the "positive hole method". The method involves counting the number of colonies from a macroscopic point of view; each visible colony corresponds to a hole in each stage of the Andersen sampler. A conversion table is then used to quickly calculate the number of viable particles.

Andersen samplers have been used in various places and industries, including (but not limited to), compost facilities, to help mitigate the health impacts of fungal spores, agriculture, to track bioaerosols more generally from livestock, textiles, apartment buildings, wastewater facilities, and even the aerosolization of anthrax following attacks in 2001. Samplers have also been used to study inert lead dust, with each stage designed to simulate the deposition characteristics of the respiratory tract.

== History ==
Information on the development of the Andersen sampler was initially classified by the US army, but is declassified as of January 24, 1958. A noted early use of the Andersen sampler was the tracking of disease in the states of Oregon and California.

Continued development of the Andersen sampler was then the focus of Andersen 2000, Inc., originally CMC Industries, which had renamed itself following the acquisition of the relevant patents. As of November 1970, the company had released four models of the Andersen sampler, each targeted towards different industries, with one being handheld. However, the stack sampler continued to be the company's most popular model.

An assessment of the Andersen Mark-II cascade impactor was published in 1988.

In 2012, a comparison was made between the "culturable particles" (CP) method and the "culturable organisms" (CO) method with the help of an Aerodynamic Particle Sizer (APS). The distributions between the CP and CO method were different enough for the null hypothesis to be rejected; the authors suggest that this may be due to the higher resolution particle count afforded by the APS, the Andersen sampler's wall losses, or the unintended collection of smaller particles in the earlier stages.

In 2013, a group of researchers improved the collection efficiency of the Andersen sampler by adding mineral oil to the petri dish agar. Results were supported through the use of an optical particle counter.

== See also ==
- Cascade impactor – Graduated method of aerosol measurement and collection
- Aerosol impaction
- Particulate matter sampler
- Bioaerosol
- Particle counter
