= Polyelectrolyte adsorption =

Adsorption of polyelectrolytes on solid substrates is a surface phenomenon where long-chained polymer molecules with charged groups (dubbed polyelectrolytes) bind to a surface that is charged in the opposite polarity. On the molecular level, the polymers do not actually bond to the surface, but tend to "stick" to the surface via intermolecular forces and the charges created by the dissociation of various side groups of the polymer. Because the polymer molecules are so long, they have a large amount of surface area with which to contact the surface and thus do not desorb as small molecules are likely to do. This means that adsorbed layers of polyelectrolytes form a very durable coating. Due to this important characteristic of polyelectrolyte layers they are used extensively in industry as flocculants, for solubilization, as supersorbers, antistatic agents, as oil recovery aids, as gelling aids in nutrition, additives in concrete, or for blood compatibility enhancement to name a few.

== Kinetics of layer formation ==
Models for the adsorption behavior of polyelectrolytes in solution to a solid surface are extremely situational. Vastly different behaviors are exhibited based on varying polyelectrolyte character and concentration, ionic strength of the solution, solid surface character, and pH, among several other factors. These complex models are specialized by application for certain parameters in order to create accurate models.

=== Theoretical kinetics ===
However, the general character of the process can be reasonably well modeled with a polyelectrolyte in solution, and an oppositely charged surface where no covalent interaction between the surface and chain occurs. This model for the adsorbed amount of polyelectrolyte at a charged surface is derived from DLVO theory, which models the interaction of charged particles in solution, and mean field theory, which simplifies systems for analysis.

Using a modified Poisson-Boltzmann equation and mean field equation, the concentration profile near a charged surface is solved numerically. The solution of these equations yields a simple relation for the adsorbed amount, Γ, based on electrolyte charge fraction, ρ, and bulk salt concentration, $c_b$.

$$\Gamma = \int_0^{\infty} \! c(x)\,dx \, \approx \frac{\left\vert y_s \right\vert^{3/2}}{{\lambda_B}{a}{p^{1/2}}}$$

where $y_s$ is the reduced surface potential:

$$y_s = \frac{{e}{\psi_s}}{{k_B}{T}} \,$$

and $\lambda_B$ is the Bjerrum length:

$$\lambda_B = \frac{e^2}{4\pi \varepsilon_0 \varepsilon_r \  k_B T},$$

=== Layer-by-layer adsorption ===
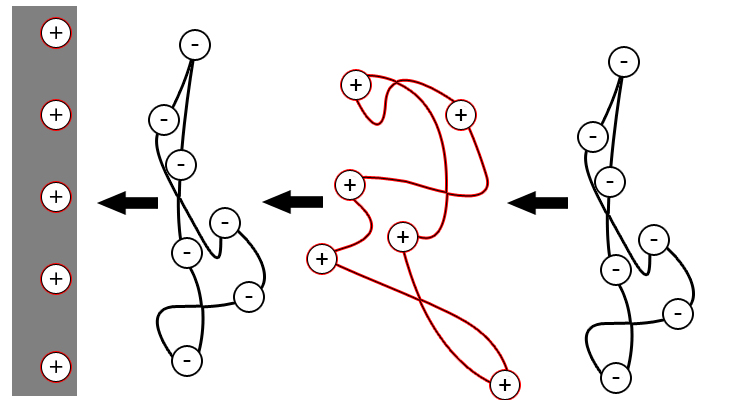
A simple schematic showing the alternating adsorption of positively and negatively charged polyelectrolytes to a solid surface.

Since charge plays a key role in polyelectrolyte adsorption, the initial rates of polyelectrolyte adsorption to charged surfaces are often rapid, limited only by the rate of mass-transport (diffusion) to the surface. This high rate then quickly drops off as charge accumulation at the surface occurs, and attractive forces are no longer drawing more polyelectrolyte chains to the surface. This drop in adsorption rates can be countered by exploiting the tendency for charge overcompensation to occur. In the case of a negatively charged solid surface, cationic polyelectrolate chains are adsorbed to the oppositely charged surface. Their large size and high charge densities tend to overcompensate the original negative surface charge, resulting in a net positive charge due to the cationic polyelectrolytes. This solid surface, with its cationic polyelectrolyte film and consequent positive surface charge, can then be exposed to an anionic polyelectrolyte solution, where the process begins again, creating another film with an oppositely charged surface. This process can then be repeated to create several bilayers on the solid surface.

== Effects of contents and quality of the solution ==
The effectiveness of polyelectrolyte adsorption is greatly affected by the contents of the solution and by the quality of the solvent in which the polyelectrolytes are dissolved. The primary mechanisms by which the solvent affects the adsorption characteristics of the surface-polymer interface are the dielectric effect of the solvent, the steric attraction or repulsion facilitated by the chemical nature of or species in the solvent, and its temperature. Repulsive steric forces are based on entropy and are caused by the reduced configuration entropy of the polymer chains. It is difficult to model precisely the interaction that any particular polyelectrolyte solution will exhibit because the steric forces are dependent upon the combination of the chemical makeup of both the polymer and the solvent as well as any ionic species present in the solution.

=== Solvent choice ===
The interactions between a polyelectrolyte and the solvent it is placed in have a large effect on the conformation of the polymer both in solution and upon deposition onto the substrate. Due to their unique nature, polyelectrolytes have many options for solvents that traditional polymers such as polyethylene, styrene, and others, would not be soluble in. An excellent example of this is water. While water is a high-polarity solvent, it will still dissolve many polyelectrolytes. The conformation of a polyelectrolyte in solution is determined by a balance of the (usually unfavorable) interactions between the solvent and the polymer, and the electrostatic repulsion between the individual repeat units of the polymer. It has been suggested that a polyelectrolyte chain will form an elongated cylindrical globule in order to optimize its energy. Some models go further and postulate that the most efficient configuration is a series of cylindrical globules linking much larger diameter spherical globules in a "necklace" configuration.

=== Good solvent ===
In a good solvent, the electrostatic forces between the repeat units of the polymer and the solvent are favorable. While not entirely intuitive, this causes the polymer to assume a more tightly packed conformation. This is due to the screening the solvent molecules perform between the charged repeat units of the polyelectrolyte, decreasing the electrostatic repulsion the polymer chain experiences. Since the polymer backbone does not repel itself as strongly as it would in a poor solvent, the polymer chain acts more similarly to an uncharged polymer, assuming a compact conformation.

=== Poor solvent ===
In a poor solvent, the solvent molecules interact poorly or unfavorably with the charged portions of the polyelectrolyte. The inability of the solvent to effectively screen the charges between repeat units causes the polymer to assume a looser conformation due to electrostatic repulsion of its repeat units. These interactions allow for the polymer to be more uniformly deposited onto the substrate.

=== Salt concentration ===
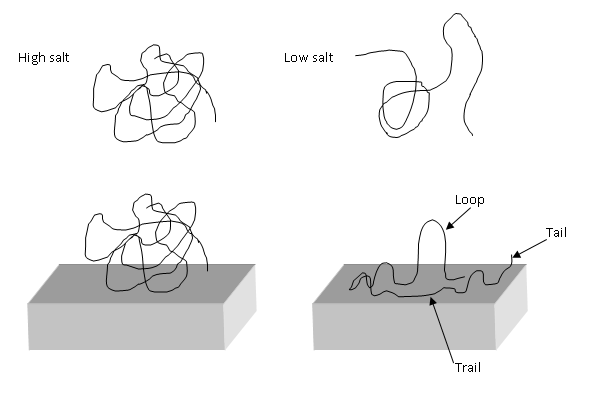
Representation of the effect of salt on a polyelectrolyte molecule in solution. Also, good solvents produce effects on polymers similar to the high salt condition and poor solvents produce effects similar to the low salt condition.

When an ionic compound is dissolved in the solvent, the ions act to screen the charges on the polyelectrolyte chains. The ionic concentration of the solution will determine the layer formation characteristics of the polyelectrolyte as well as the conformation the polymer assumes in solution.

==== High salt ====
High salt concentrations cause conditions similar to the interactions experienced by a polymer in a favorable solvent. Polyelectrolytes, while charged, are still mainly non-polar with carbon backbones. While the charges on the polymer backbone exert an electrostatic force that drives the polymer into a more open and loose conformation, if the surrounding solution has a high concentration of salt, then the charge repulsion will be screened. Once this charge is screened the polyelectrolyte will act as any other non-polar polymer would in a high ionic strength solution and begin to minimize interactions with the solvent. This leads to a much more clumped and dense polymer deposited onto the surface.

==== Low Salt ====
In a low ionic strength solution, the charges present on the repeat units of the polymer are the dominant force controlling conformation. Since there is very little charge present to screen the repulsive interactions between the repeat units, the polymer assumes a very spread out, loose conformation. This conformation allows for more uniform layering on the substrate, which is helpful in preventing surface defects and non-uniform surface properties.

== Industrial uses of polyelectrolyte layers ==
Polyelectrolytes can be applied to multiple types of surfaces due to the variety of ionic polymers available. They can be applied to solid surfaces in multi-layer form to fulfill a variety of design objectives, they can be used to surround solid particles to enhance the stability of a colloidal system, and they can even be assembled to form an independent structure that can be used to ferry drugs throughout the human body.

Polyelectrolyte	Full Name	Application
polyDADMAC	polydiallyldimethylammonium chloride	heavy waste water flocculant
PAH-Naf / PAH-PAA	poly(allylamine)-Nafion / poly (acrylic acid)	mechanically responsive variable hydrophobicity film
DMLPEI/PAA	linear N, N-dodecyl,methyl-poly(ethyleneimine) / poly (acrylic acid)	microbicidal coating
PEI	poly(ethyleneimine)	anchoring layer for biosensor electrode
PSS	poly (styrene sulfonate)	bilayer component for biosensor coating
PAH	poly (allylamine hydrochloride)	bilayer component for biosensor coating
PAH-PAA	poly (allylamine / poly(acrylic acid)	pH-induced controlled delivery of methylene blue
PAA/PEO-b-PCL	poly (acrylic acid) / polyethylene oxide - block - polycaprolactone	Triclosan drug delivery through degradation release.

=== Polymer coatings ===
Polyelectrolyte multi-layers are a promising area of research in the polymer coating industry because they can be applied in a spray-on fashion at low cost in a water-based solvent. Although the polymers are held to the surface only by electrostatic forces, the multi-layer coatings adhere aggressively under liquid shear. The disadvantage to this coating technology is that the layers have the consistency of a gel and thus are weak against abrasion.

==== Stainless steel corrosion resistance ====
Polyelectrolytes have been used by scientists to coat stainless steel using the layer-by-layer application method in order to inhibit corrosion. The exact mechanism by which corrosion is restricted is unknown because polyelectrolyte multi-layers are water-logged and of a gel-like consistency. One theory is that the layers form a barrier impenetrable to small ions that facilitate corrosion of the steel. Additionally, the water molecules within the multi-layer film are held in a restricted state by the ionic groups of the polyelectrolytes. This decreases the chemical activity of the water at the surface of the steel.

==== Implant enhancement ====
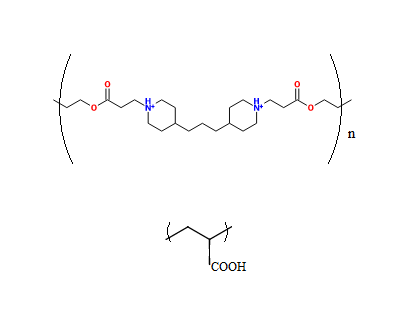
Precursor monomers for a base layer of a microbicidal implant-enhancing polyelectrolyte multi-layer. The top is DMLPEI, and bottom is PAA.

Many biomedical devices that come into contact with bodily fluids are susceptible to adverse foreign body response, or rejection and thus, failure of the device. The main mechanism of infection is the formation of a biofilm, which is a matrix of sessile bacteria consisting of around 15% bacterial cells by mass and 85% hydrophobic exopolysaccharide fibers. One way to eliminate this risk is to apply localized treatment to the area in the vicinity of the implant. This can be done by applying a drug-impregnated polyelectrolyte multi-layer to the medical device prior to implantation. The goal with this technology is to create a combination of polyelectrolyte multi-layers where one multi-layer prevents the formation of a biofilm and another releases a small-molecule drug through diffusion. This would be more effective than the current technique of releasing a high dose of drugs into the body and counting on some of it to navigate to the afflicted area. The base layer for an effective coating for an implant is DMLPEI/PAA, or linear N, N-dodecyl,methyl-poly(ethyleneimine) / poly (acrylic acid).

=== Colloid stability ===
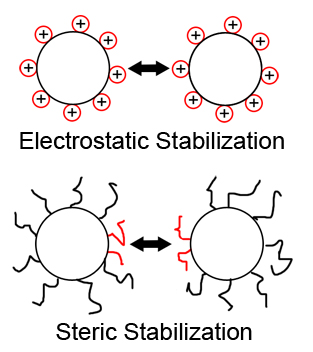
Top: The electrostatic contribution to colloid stability, showing two like-charged particles repelling each other. Bottom: The steric contribution to colloid stability, showing polymer chains opposing being pushed together and confined, causing a repulsion due to the unfavorable decrease in entropy.

Another of the major applications of polyelectrolyte adsorption is the stabilization (or destabilization) of solid colloidal suspensions, or sols. Particles in solution tend to have attractive forces similar to van der Waals forces, modeled by Hamaker theory. These forces tend to cause colloidal particles to aggregate or flocculate. The Hamaker attractive effect is balanced by one or both of two repulsive effects of colloids in solution. The first is electrostatic stabilization, in which like charges of the particles repel one another. This effect is due to the zeta potential that exists due to a particle's surface charge in solution. The second is steric stabilization, due to steric effects. Drawing particles together with adsorbed polymer chains greatly decreases the conformational entropy of the polymer chains at the surface, which is thermodynamically unfavorable, making flocculation and coagulation more difficult.

The adsorption of polyelectrolytes can be used to stabilize suspensions, such as in the case of dyes and paints. It can also be used to destabilize suspensions by adsorbing oppositely charged chains to the particle surface, neutralizing the zeta-potential and causing flocculation or coagulation of contaminants. This is used heavily in waste-water treatment to force suspensions of contaminants to flocculate, allowing them to be filtered. There are a variety of industrial flocculants that are either cationic or anionic in nature for targeting particular species.

=== Encapsulation of liquid cores ===
An application of the additional stability a polyelectrolyte multi-layer will grant a colloid is the creation of a solid coating for a liquid core. While polyelectrolyte layers are generally adsorbed onto solid substrates, they may also be adsorbed to liquid substrates such as oil in water emulsions or colloids. This process has much potential, but is rife with difficulty. Since colloids are generally stabilized by surfactants, and often ionic surfactants, the adsorption of a multi-layer that is similarly charged to the surfactant causes problems due to the electrostatic repulsion between the polyelectrolyte and the surfactant. This can be circumvented by using non-ionic surfactants; however, the solubility of these non-ionic surfactants in water is greatly decreased compared to ionic surfactants.

These cores, once created, can be used for things such as drug delivery and microreactors. For drug delivery, the polyelectrolyte shell would break down after a certain amount of time, releasing the drug and helping it travel through the digestive tract, which is one of the biggest barriers for the effectiveness of drug delivery.
