= Chronicle Figures =

Company logo

Chronicle Figures was a British company that produced miniature figures.

== History ==
Chronicle Figures was found by British miniatures sculptor Nick Lund in the 1970s, and produced 25mm fantasy figures for the burgeoning role-playing game industry.

After Chronicle was bought by Citadel Miniatures in 1984, Lund worked for Citadel, which continued to produce Lund's old lines as well as his new sculpts, all sold under the Chronicle brand.

In 1986, Lund left Citadel to become head of design at Grenadier Models (UK), and Citadel discontinued the Chronicle brand.

== Reception ==
In the September 1983 edition of Imagine, Ian J. Knight commented on the "sheer presence" of the latest line of hobgoblins from Chronicle, commenting favourably on their "bulky, squat, powerful look, loaded with beefy menace." Knight lauded the quality of the miniatures, saying, "There is a clarity of definition about the sculpting and the casting which makes every rivet in the armour and every stud in the shield seem remarkably real." He concluded, "They've developed a very distinctive character of their own, and the quality seems to improve with each new release. Thoroughly recommended."
