= Fecal impaction =

Solid buildup of feces in the rectum due to chronic constipation

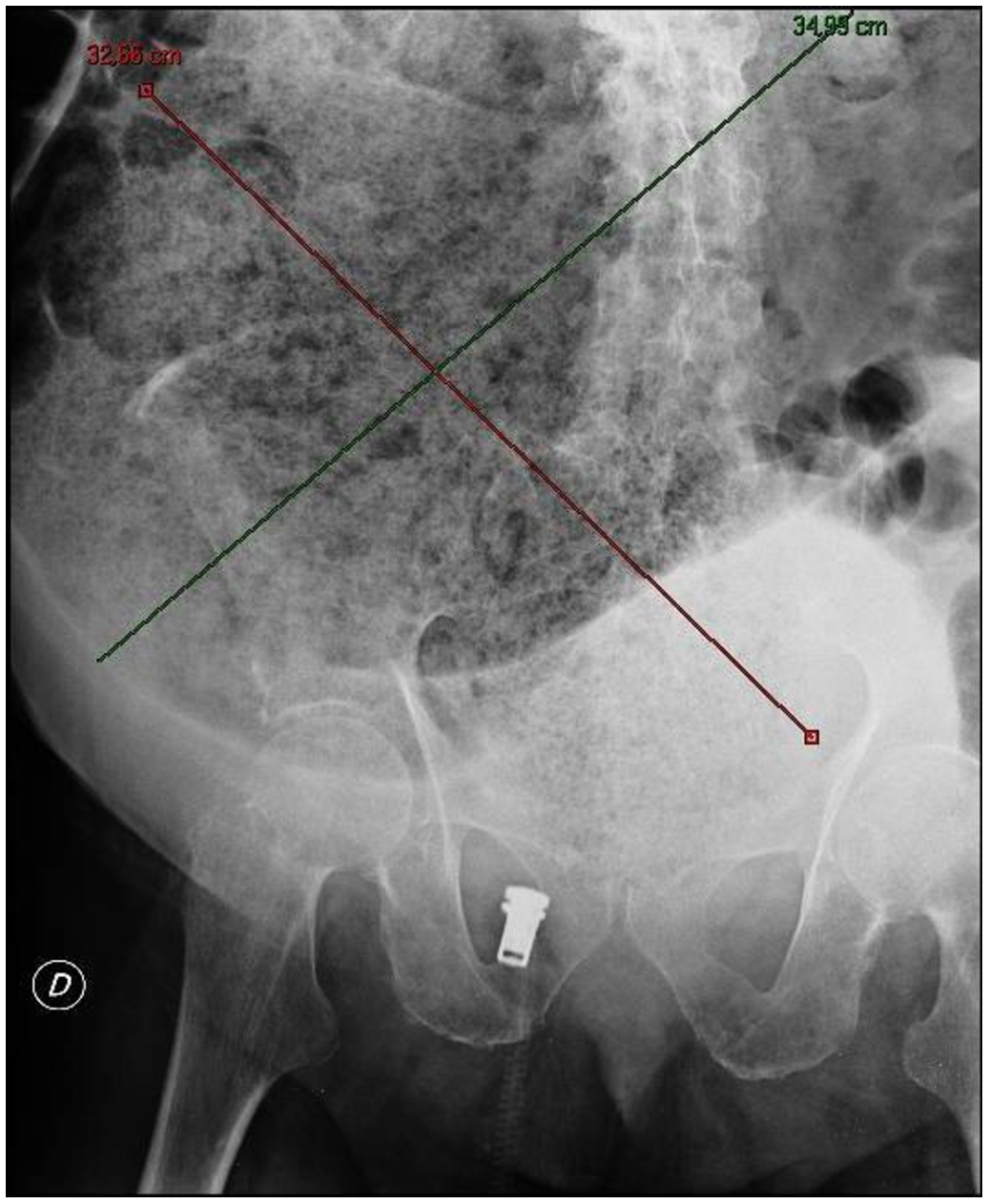
- Plain abdominal X-ray showing a large fecal impaction extending from the pelvis upwards to the left subphrenic space and from the left towards the right flank, measuring over 40 cm in length and 33 cm in width.
- Specialty: Gastroenterology

A fecal impaction or an impacted bowel is a solid, immobile bulk of feces that can develop in the colon (proximal fecal impaction) or rectum (distal fecal impaction) as a result of chronic constipation (a related term is fecal loading, which refers to a large volume of stool in the rectum of any consistency). Fecal impaction is a common result of neurogenic bowel dysfunction and causes immense discomfort and pain. Commonly affected populations include the elderly and chronically ill, especially those with neuropsychiatric diseases. It is estimated that 50% of elderly patients in geriatric wards and nursing homes suffer from fecal impaction in the course of a year. Treatment includes laxatives, enemas, and pulsed irrigation evacuation (PIE) as well as digital removal. This condition requires direct treatment to resolve.

== Signs and symptoms ==
Symptoms of a fecal impaction include the following:

- Chronic constipation
- Fecal incontinence – paradoxical overflow diarrhea (encopresis) as a result of liquid stool passing around the obstruction
- Abdominal pain and bloating
- Loss of appetite

Complications include bowel obstruction, necrosis and ulcers of the rectal tissue, stercoral colitis, fistula formation, colonic perforation, hemorrhage, and sepsis. As fecal impaction tends to affect elderly and chronically ill populations, complications can prove to be fatal if left untreated.

== Causes ==
There are many possible causes; these include a long period of physical inactivity, failure to consume adequate dietary fiber, dehydration, and deliberate retention of fecal matter.

Opioids such as fentanyl, buprenorphine, methadone, codeine, oxycodone, hydrocodone, morphine, and hydromorphone as well as certain sedatives that reduce intestinal movement may cause fecal matter to become too large, hard and/or dry to expel.

Specific conditions, such as irritable bowel syndrome, certain neurological disorders, paralytic ileus, gastroparesis, diabetes, enlarged prostate gland, distended colon, an ingested foreign object, inflammatory bowel diseases such as Crohn's disease and colitis, and autoimmune diseases such as amyloidosis, celiac disease, lupus, and scleroderma can cause a fecal impaction. Hypothyroidism can also cause chronic constipation because of sluggish, slower, or weaker colon contractions. Iron supplements or increased blood calcium levels are also potential causes, the former by contributing to constipation resulting from changes in the digestive system that can lead to harder, drier stools, the latter by slowing down intestinal motility and potentially reducing fluid secretion in the gut. Spinal cord injury is a common cause of constipation, due to ileus.

== Diagnosis ==
A thorough, directed history and physical examination should be obtained in all patients presenting with signs and symptoms of fecal impaction. During the physical examination, special attention should be paid to the abdominal and anorectal components. Digital rectal examination can reveal "palpable impacted feces" in the rectal ampulla. The anorectal area should be evaluated for the presence of blood and ulcers and if feces is encountered the size and consistency should be assessed.

Diagnostic imaging can be used in evaluation of fecal impaction and its complications.

- Contrast Enhanced CT Scan:
  - Entirely intraluminal mass suggestive of a fecaloma
  - "Focal thickening of bowel wall and pericolonic fat stranding" suggestive of stercoral colitis
  - Free intraperitoneal gas can be concerning for bowel perforation
- Projectional radiography
- Ultrasound
- CT scan

== Prevention ==
Prevention is the best way to avoid the complications of fecal impaction. Ways to reduce fecal burden include reducing or replacing opiates, adequate intake of water, dietary fiber, and exercise.

For patients that are in nursing homes or in a medical facility for a prolonged period of time, there should be daily recordings of bowel movements and the use of stool softeners should be encouraged. For patients that are bedridden or have a baseline demented mental status, instilling a fiber restricted diet and cleansing enemas weekly is a strategy for managing bowel function.

After a fecal disimpaction, a bowel regimen that encourages a bowel movement at least once every other day is recommended. Pharmacotherapy such as sorbitol, lactulose, PEG solution, or a combination may be implemented with the use of bisacodyl or glycerin suppositories if the goal for bowel movements is not reached.

== Treatment ==
Decreased motility of the colon results in dry, hard stools that in the case of fecal impaction become compacted into a large, hard mass of stool that cannot be expelled from the rectum.

Various methods of treatment attempt to remove the impaction by softening the stool, lubricating the stool, or breaking it into pieces small enough for removal. Enemas and osmotic laxatives can be used to soften the stool by increasing the water content until the stool is soft enough to be expelled. Osmotic laxatives such as magnesium citrate work within minutes to eight hours for onset of action, and even then they may not be sufficient to expel the stool.

Osmotic laxatives can cause cramping and even severe pain as the patient's attempts to evacuate the contents of the rectum are blocked by the fecal mass. Polyethylene glycol (PEG 3350) may be used to increase the water content of the stool without cramping. This may take 24 to 48 hours, however, and it is not well suited to cases where the impaction needs to be removed immediately due to risk of complications or severe pain. Enemas (such as hyperosmotic saline) and suppositories (such as glycerine suppositories) work by increasing water content and stimulating peristalsis to aid in expulsion, and both work much more quickly than oral laxatives.

Because enemas work in 2–15 minutes, they do not allow sufficient time for a large fecal mass to soften. Even if the enema is successful at dislodging the impacted stool, the impacted stool may remain too large to be expelled through the anal canal. Mineral oil enemas can assist by lubricating the stool for easier passage. In cases where enemas fail to remove the impaction, polyethylene glycol can be used to attempt to soften the mass over 24–48 hours, or if immediate removal of the mass is needed, manual disimpaction may be used. Manual disimpaction may be performed by lubricating the anus and using one gloved finger with a scoop-like motion to break up the fecal mass. Most often manual disimpaction is performed without general anaesthesia, although sedation may be used. In more involved procedures, general anaesthesia may be used, although the use of general anaesthesia increases the risk of damage to the anal sphincter. If all other treatments fail, surgery may be necessary.

Another treatment method makes use of an enema and manual disimpaction via pulsed irrigation evacuation (PIE). By using pulsating water to enter into the colon to soften and break down the dense mass, PIE treats fecal impaction.

Research shows that pulsed irrigation evacuation with the PIE MED device is successful in all tested patients in studies, making pulsed irrigation evacuation the most effective and reliable form of fecal impaction treatment.

Individuals who have had one fecal impaction are at high risk of future impactions. Therefore, preventive treatment should be instituted in patients following the removal of the mass. Increasing dietary fiber, increasing fluid intake, exercising daily, and attempting regularly to defecate every morning after eating should be promoted in all patients.

Often underlying medical conditions cause fecal impactions; these conditions should be treated to reduce the risk of future impactions. Many types of medications (most notably opioid pain medications, such as codeine) reduce motility of the colon, increasing the likelihood of fecal impactions. If possible, alternate medications should be prescribed that avoid the side effect of constipation.

Given that all opioids can cause constipation, it is recommended that any patient placed on opioid pain medications be given medications to prevent constipation before it occurs. Daily medications can also be used to promote normal motility of the colon and soften stools. Daily use of laxatives or enemas should be avoided by most individuals as it can cause the loss of normal colon motility. However, for patients with chronic complications, daily medication under the direction of a physician may be needed.

Polyethylene glycol 3350 can be taken daily to soften the stools without the significant risk of adverse effects that are common with other laxatives.

== Fecaloma ==
A fecaloma is a more extreme form of fecal impaction, giving the accumulation an appearance of a tumor.

A fecaloma can develop as the fecal matter gradually stagnates and accumulates in the intestine and increases in volume until the intestine becomes deformed. It may occur in chronic obstruction of stool transit, as in megacolon and chronic constipation. Some diseases, such as Chagas disease, Hirschsprung's disease and others damage the autonomic nervous system in the colon's mucosa (Auerbach's plexus) and may cause extremely large or "giant" fecalomas, which must be surgically removed (disimpaction). Rarely, a fecalith will form around a hairball (Trichobezoar), or other absorbent or desiccant core.

It can be diagnosed by:

- CT scan
- Projectional radiography
- Ultrasound

Distal or sigmoid, fecalomas can often be disimpacted digitally or by a catheter which carries a flow of disimpaction fluid (water or other solvent or lubricant). Surgical intervention in the form of sigmoid colectomy or proctocolectomy and ileostomy may be required only when all conservative measures of evacuation fail. Attempts at removal can have severe and even lethal effects, such as the rupture of the colon wall by catheter or an acute angle of the fecaloma (stercoral perforation), followed by sepsis. It may also lead to stercoral perforation, a condition characterized by bowel perforation due to pressure necrosis from a fecal mass or fecaloma.

== See also ==
- Aerosol impaction
- Dental impaction
- Impaction (animals)
