= Polymer adsorption =

Adsorption is the adhesion of ions or molecules onto the surface of another phase. Adsorption may occur via physisorption and chemisorption. Ions and molecules can adsorb to many types of surfaces including polymer surfaces. A polymer is a large molecule composed of repeating subunits bound together by covalent bonds. In dilute solution, polymers form globule structures. When a polymer adsorbs to a surface that it interacts favorably with, the globule is essentially squashed, and the polymer has a pancake structure.

== Polymer versus non-polymer surfaces ==
Polymer surfaces differ from non-polymer surfaces in that the subunits that make up the surface are covalently bonded to one another. Non-polymer surfaces can be bound by ionic bonds, metallic bonds or intermolecular forces (IMFs). In a two component system, non-polymer surfaces form when a positive net amount of energy is required to break self-interactions and form non-self-interactions. Therefore, the energy of mixing (Δ_{mix}G) is positive. This amount of energy, as described by interfacial tension, varies for different combinations of materials. However, with polymer surfaces, the subunits are covalently bonded together and the bulk phase of the solid surface does not allow for surface tension to be measured directly. The intermolecular forces between the large polymer molecules are difficult to calculate and cannot be determined as easily as non-polymer surface molecular interactions. The covalently bonded subunits form a surface with differing properties as compared to non-polymer surfaces. Some examples of polymer surfaces include: polyvinyl chloride (PVC), nylon, polyethylene (PE), and polypropylene (PP). Polymer surfaces have been analyzed using a variety of techniques, including: scanning electron microscopy, scanning tunneling microscopy, and infrared spectroscopy.

=== Adsorption isotherms ===
The adsorption process can be characterized by determining what amount of the ions or molecules are adsorbed to the surface. This amount can be determined experimentally by the construction of an adsorption isotherm. An adsorption isotherm is a graph of Γ(P,T) versus partial pressure of the adsorbate(P/P_{0}) for a given constant temperature, where Γ(P,T) is the number of molecules adsorbed per surface area. As the partial pressure of the adsorbate increases, the number of molecules per area also increases.

=== Contact angle and surface tension ===
Contact angle, the angle at which a liquid droplet meets at a solid surface, is another way to characterize polymer surfaces. Contact angle (θ) is a measure of the wetting ability of the liquid on a solid surface. Generally, due to low surface energy, liquids will not wet polymer surfaces and the contact angle will be greater than 90°. The liquid molecules are more attracted to other liquid molecules as compared to the polymer surface. Because the polymer surfaces are solid surfaces, surface tension cannot be measured in a traditional way such as using a Wilhelmy plate. Instead, contact angles can be used to indirectly estimate the surface tension of polymer surfaces. This is accomplished by measuring the contact angles of a series of liquids on a polymer surface. A Fox and Zisman plot of cos θ versus surface tensions of the liquids(γ_{L}) gives a straight line which can be extrapolated back to determine the critical surface tension of the solid (γ_{c}).

$\cos\theta = 1 - \beta(\gamma_L - \gamma_c)\$

Where:

$\theta$ is the contact angle
$\gamma_L$ is the surface tension of the liquid
$\gamma_c$ is the critical surface tension of the solid

The variable β was previously determined to be approximately 0.03 to 0.04. While the actual surface tension of the solid polymer surface cannot be determined, the Fox and Zisman plot serves as an estimate. However, this estimate may be skewed if there are significant intermolecular forces between the surface and the liquid. Also, this plot is not applicable for binary mixtures of liquids dropped onto a polymer surface. Some estimated surface tensions of different polymers and the contact angles of different liquids on polymer surfaces is shown below.

Polymer	γ_{c} (mN/m)
Polystyrene (PS)	40.7
Polyvinylacetate (PVA)	36.5
Teflon	20
Polymethylacrylic acid (PMAA)	41
Polypropylene	33
Silicone	24
Polyimide	40
Nylon 6/6	41
Polyacrylamide	56

=== Adsorption and charge relationship ===
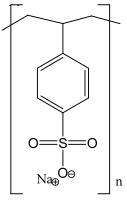
The structure of sodium polystyrene sulfonate is shown. When this salt is dissolved in a solvent, the negatively charged side group can adsorb positively charged adsorbates.

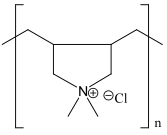
The structure of poly(diallyldimethylammonium chloride), polyDADMAC, is shown. When the salt is dissolved in a solvent, the positively charged side group can adsorb negatively charged adsorbates.

Different polymer surfaces have different side chains on their monomers that can become charged due to the adsorption or dissociation of adsorbates. For example, polystyrene sulfonate has monomers containing negatively charged side chains which can adsorb positively charged adsorbates. Polystyrene sulfonate will adsorb more positively charged adsorbate than negatively charged. Conversely, for a polymer that contains positively charged side chains, such as poly(diallyldimethylammonium chloride), negatively charged adsorbates will be strongly attracted.

== Thermodynamics of polymer surfaces ==
=== Contact angle ===
Because the ability of a surface to adsorb molecules onto its surface depends on energies of interaction, thermodynamics of adsorption can be used to understand the driving forces for adsorption. To measure the thermodynamics of polymer surfaces, contact angles are often used to easily obtain useful information. The thermodynamic description of contact angles of a drop of liquid on a solid surface are derived from the equilibrium formed between the chemical potentials of the solid–liquid, solid–vapor, and liquid–vapor interfaces.

A contact angle of a liquid sample

At equilibrium, the contact angle of a liquid drop on a surface does not change. Therefore, the Gibbs free energy is equal to 0:

$$dG=0$$

The chemical potentials of the three interfaces must cancel out, producing Young's equation for the relationship between surface energies and contact angles:

$$\gamma_L \cos \theta_\mathrm{C} \,=\gamma_\mathrm{SV} - \gamma_\mathrm{SL} - \pi_\mathrm{e}$$

where:

$\gamma_L$ is the surface tension of the liquid
$\theta_\mathrm{C}$ is the contact angle of the liquid
$\gamma_\mathrm{SV}$ is the surface tension of the solid–vapor interface
$\gamma_\mathrm{SL}$ is the surface tension of the solid–liquid interface
$\pi_\mathrm{e}$ is the vapor pressure of the liquid at equilibrium.

However, this equation cannot be used to determine the surface energy of a solid surface by itself. It can be used in conjunction with the following equation to determine the relationship between contact angle and surface energy of the solid, as surface tension ≈ surface energy for a solid:

$$\gamma_\mathrm{SL}=\gamma_\mathrm{S}+\gamma_\mathrm{L}-2\sqrt{\gamma_\mathrm{S,d}\gamma_\mathrm{S,d}}-2\sqrt{\gamma_\mathrm{S,p}\gamma_\mathrm{S,p}}$$

where

$\gamma_\mathrm{S}$ is the surface energy of the solid
$\gamma_\mathrm{L}$ is the surface tension of the liquid.
$\gamma_\mathrm{S,d}$ and $\gamma_\mathrm{S,p}$ are the dispersive and polar components of the surface energy of the solid

Using these two equations, the surface energy of a solid can be determined simply by measuring the contact angle of two different liquids of known surface tension on that solid's surface.

=== Copolymers ===
For heterogeneous surfaces (consisting of two or more different types of material), the contact angle of a drop of liquid at each point along the three phase contact line with a solid surface is a result of the surface tension of the surface at that point. For example, if the heterogeneous regions of the surface form very large domains, and the drop exists entirely within a homogeneous domain, then it will have a contact angle corresponding to the surface tension of that homogeneous region.

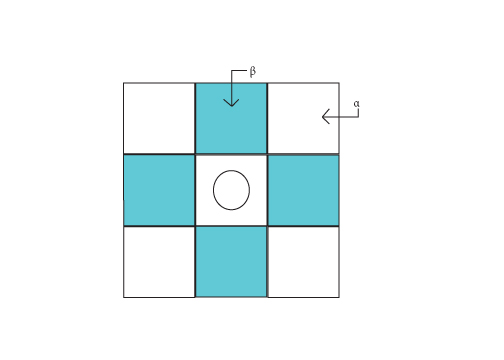
With large enough homogeneous domains, the observed contact angle may correspond entirely to a single component of a surface.

Likewise, a drop that straddles two domains of differing surface tensions will have different contact angles along the three phase contact line corresponding to the different surface tensions at each point.

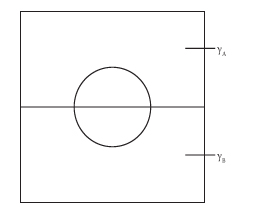
if the surface energies of the two phases are different, this drop will show two distinct contact angles- one in the top phase and another in the bottom phase.

However, with sufficiently small domains (such as in those of a block copolymer), the observed surface energy of the surface approaches the weighted average of the surface energies of each of the constituents of the surface:

$$\gamma_{polymer} =\sum_{i=1}^n f_i \gamma_i$$

where:

$\gamma_{polymer}$ is the overall surface energy of the polymer
$f_i$ is the fraction of the i^{th} component of the polymer's surface
$\gamma_i$ is the surface energy of the i^{th} component

This occurs because as the size of the homogeneous domains become very small compared to the size of the drop, the differences in contact angles along different homogeneous regions becomes indistinguishable from the average of the contact angles.

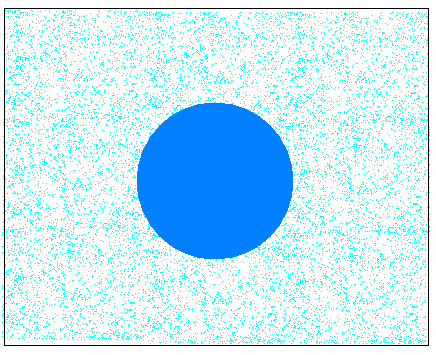
When the size of domains becomes small enough, it becomes hard to distinguish one area from another, causing surface properties to manifest as a weighted average of area fraction

The observed contact angle is given by the following formula:

$$\cos\theta\ \mathrm{obs}=\sum_{i=1}^n f_i \cos\theta_i$$

where:

$f_i$ is the fraction of i^{th} component
$\theta_i$ is the contact angle i^{th} component

If the polymer is made out of only two different monomers, it is possible use the above equation to determine the composition of the polymer simply by measuring the contact angle of a drop of liquid placed on it:

$$\cos\theta\ \mathrm{obs}=\ f \cos\theta_1 +(1-f)\cos\theta_2$$

where:

$\theta\ \mathrm{obs}$ is the observed contact angle
f is the area fraction of one component, and $(1-f)$ the area fraction of the other.
$\theta_1$ and $\theta_2$ are the contact angles of the first and second components of the polymer.

=== Surface Coverage ===
One of the defining features of polymer surfaces and coatings is the chemical regularity of the surface. While many materials can be irregular mixtures of different components, polymer surfaces tend to be chemically uniform, with the same distribution of different functional groups across all areas of the surface. Because of this, adsorption of molecules onto polymer surfaces can be easily modeled by the Langmuir or Frumkin Isotherms. The Langmuir equation states that for the adsorption of a molecule of adsorbate A onto a surface binding site S, a single binding site is used, and each free binding site is equally likely to accept a molecule of adsorbate:

$$\ce{A + S <=> A - S}$$

where:

A is the adsorbate
S is the surface binding site
$A - S$ is the bound adsorbate/binding site pair

The equilibrium constant for this reaction is then defined as:

$$k_{ad} = \frac{[A - S]}{[A] [B]}$$

The equilibrium constant is related to the equilibrium surface coverage θ, which is given by:

$$\theta\ = \frac{k_{ad} [A]}{k_{ad} [A] + 1}$$

where:

θ is the surface coverage (fraction, 0 is empty, 1 is fully covered)
$k_{ad}$ is the adsorption equilibrium constant

=== Adsorption energy ===
Because many polymers are composed of primarily of hydrocarbon chains with at most slightly polar functional groups, they tend to have low surface energies and thus adsorb rather poorly. While this can be advantageous for some applications, modification of polymer surfaces is crucial for many other applications in which adhering a substrate to its surface is vital for optimal performance. For example, many applications utilize polymers as structural components, but which degrade rapidly when exposed to weather or other sources of wear. Therefore, coatings must be used which protect the structural layer from damage. However, the poor adhesive properties of nonpolar polymers makes it difficult to adsorb the protective coating onto its surface. These types of problems make the measurement and control of surface energies important to development of useful technologies.

The Gibbs energy of adsorption, $\Delta G_{ad}$, can be determined from the adsorption equilibrium constant:

$$\Delta G_{ad} = -RT\ln K_{ad}.$$

Because $\Delta G_{ad}$ is negative for a spontaneous process and positive for a nonspontaneous process, it can be used to understand the tendency for different compounds to adsorb to a surface. In addition, it can be divided into a combination of two components:

$$\Delta G_{ad} = \Delta G_p + \Delta G_c,$$

which are the Gibbs energies of physisorption and chemisorption, respectively. Many polymer applications, such as those which use polytetrafluoroethylene (PTFE, or Teflon) require the use of a surface with specific physisorption properties toward one type of material, while being firmly adhered in place to a different type of material. Because the physisorption energy is so low for these types of materials, chemisorption is used to form covalent bonds between the polymer coating and the surface of the object (such as a pan) which holds it in place. Because the relative magnitudes of chemisorption processes are generally much greater than magnitudes of physisorption processes, this forms a strong bond between the polymer and the surface it is chemically adhered to, while allowing the polymer to retain its physisorption characteristics toward other materials.

Experimentally, the enthalpy and entropy of adsorption are often used to fine-tune the adsorption properties of a material. The enthalpy of adsorption can be determined from constant pressure calorimetry:

$$Q = -\Delta H_{ad} N,$$

where:

$Q$ is the heat exchanged,
$\Delta H_{ad}$ is the integral molar enthalpy of adsorption,
$N$ is the number of moles adsorbed.

From the enthalpy of adsorption, the entropy of adsorption can be calculated:

$$\Delta S_{ad} = \frac{\Delta H_{ad}}{T},$$

where:

$\Delta S_{ad}$ is the integral molar entropy of adsorption,
$T$ is the temperature in kelvins.

Together, these are used to understand the driving forces behind adsorption processes.

== Applications ==
=== Implant Coatings ===
==== Protein-resistant coatings ====
Protein adsorption influences the interactions that occur at the tissue-implant interface. Protein adsorption can lead to blood clots, the foreign-body response and ultimately the degradation of the device. In order to counter-act the effects of protein adsorption, implants are often coated with a polymer coating to decrease protein adsorption.

Polyethylene glycol (PEG) coatings have been shown to minimize protein adsorption in the body. The PEG coating consists of hydrophilic molecules that are repulsive to protein adsorption. Proteins consist of hydrophobic molecules and charge sites that want to bind to other hydrophobic molecules and oppositely charged sites. By applying a thin monolayer coating of PEG, protein adsorption is prevented at the device site. Furthermore, the device's resistance to protein adsorption, fibroblast adhesion and bacteria adhesion are increased.

==== Antithrombogenic coatings ====
The hemocompatability of a medical device is dependent upon surface charge, energy and topography. Devices that fail to be hemocompatabile run the risk of forming a thrombus, proliferation and compromising the immune system. Polymer coatings are applied to devices to increase their hemocompatability. Chemical cascades lead to the formation of fibrous clots. By choosing to use hydrophilic polymer coatings, protein adsorption decreases and the chance of negative interactions with the blood diminishes as well. One such polymer coating that increases hemocompatability is heparin. Heparin is a polymer coating that interacts with thrombin to prevent coagulation. Heparin has been shown to suppress platelet adhesion, complement activation and protein adsorption.

=== Structural ===
==== Advanced polymer composites ====
Advanced polymer composites are used in the strengthening and rehabilitation of old structures. These advanced composites can be made using many different methods including prepreg, resin, infusion, filament winding and pultrusion. Advanced polymer composites are used in many airplane structures and their largest market is in aerospace and defense.

==== Fiber reinforced polymers ====
Fiber-reinforced polymers (FRP) are commonly used by civil engineers in their structures. FRPs respond linear-elastically to axial stress, making them a great material to hold a load. FRPs are usually in a laminate formation with each lamina having unidirectional fibers, typically carbon or glass, embedded within a layer of light polymer matrix material. FRPs have great resistance against environmental exposure and great durability.

=== Polytetrafluoroethylene ===
Polytetrafluoroethylene (PTFE) is a polymer used in many applications including non-stick coatings, beauty products, and lubricants. PTFE is a hydrophobic molecule composed of carbon and fluorine. Carbon-fluorine bonds cause PTFE to be a low-friction material, conducive in high temperature environments and resistant to stress cracking. These properties cause PTFE to be non-reactive and used in a wide array of applications.
