= Bathimpact =

Student newspaper at the University of Bath

- Type: Fortnightly newspaper
- Format: Compact (Tabloid)
- Owner(s): University of Bath Students' Union
- Editor: John Barlow
- Founded: 2000; 25 years ago
- Language: English
- Headquarters: BUSU, University of Bath, BATH, BA2 7AY
- Price: Free

Bathimpact (stylised as "bathimpact") is the student newspaper for the University of Bath Students' Union, England.

== History and format ==
Student Impact was created from the merger of two former publications at the University of Bath, Spike and Sponge. Sponge was the University of Bath Students' Union paper which had been running for the previous 30 years, while Spike was a student-run magazine concentrating mainly on film, music and book reviews. In December 1999, following controversy over an article in Sponge entitled "How to stuff your bird at Christmas", the Students' Union took the decision to stop the publication of Sponge. Spike had been struggling from a lack of contributors and funding for some time. The Students' Union Media and Communications Officer, Peter Secchi, together with founding Editor Arthur Lewis, put out the first issue of Student Impact on 14 February 2000.

On 22 February 2010, just over a decade after the paper was created, it was relaunched and rebranded as "Bathimpact".

The paper runs on a fortnightly basis, with a print run of 2,000.

The newspaper was originally split into seven sections, News, Opinion, Features, International, Science, Entertainments and Sport. It is produced on a voluntary basis by the 10 editors and over 100 contributors. In November 2010 the Bathimpact team decided to alter the newspaper by combining the Features and Entertainment section into a 16-page magazine-style insert called 'bite' (Bathimpact lite). 'bite' covers features, food, fashion, film, literature, theatre, music, technology and puzzles.

== Student Media awards ==
The online site for Student Impact, impact Online (created by Ben Braine), was shortlisted in 2003 for the Student Website of the year award at the Guardian Student Media Awards. In the same year the Impact team scooped the "Student Activity of the Year Award" at their own University of Bath Students' Union's Societies Awards.

== University awards ==
Since 1994, the University of Bath has been awarding The Chancellor's Prize to the best final year student at the university. In 2004, this was awarded to Tom Vincent, a previous editor in chief. The following year, Heather Mackenzie, a former sports editor for the paper, took the award.

In 2008, it was awarded to Jack Mitchell, the editor in chief at the time. Part of the information released by the university stated "As Editor-in-Chief of the Students' Union newspaper Impact and contributor to the general management of the Students' Union, he was acknowledged to have played an important part in the general life of the University."
