= Torchlight Fantasy Products =

Board game company

- Company type: Private
- Industry: Role playing
- Founded: 1983
- Founder: Matt Love
- Defunct: 1986
- Headquarters: Westcliff, United Kingdom

Torchlight Fantasy Products was a company that produced small-scale three-dimensional resin dungeons for use with miniature figures.

== History ==
Torchlight Fantasy Products was founded in 1983 by Matt Love in the United Kingdom, and produced cast resin accessory kits for use with fantasy role-playing games such as Dungeons & Dragons. Pieces included parts of dungeons such as corridors and walls, as well as chests, tables and chairs.

The company sold its assets in 1986 and went out of business.

== Reception ==
In the March 1985 edition of White Dwarf (Issue 63), Joe Dever and Gary Chalk noted that these products were "cast in resin, which has many advantageous properties, [being] more resilient that stone-cast material, and far lighter." They called the line of products "comprehensive" and easy to paint, concluding that "many of the items such as doors, windows, chests and beds, can be used in conjunction with normal 2-D floor plans."

In the September 1983 edition of Imagine (Issue 6), Ian J. Knight was impressed by the sheer variety of pieces available, saying that this was "sufficient to allow for most possibilities, and when assembled and painted the sets do look most attractive." He concluded "In all, a very useful range which will add a degree of visual realism."

Doug Cowie reviewed Torchlight Dungeon Models for Imagine magazine, and stated that "these are excellent models, rather fragile in some circumstances and with limited appeal to those who wish to play D&D in extensive and varied settings."
