= Dixon Miniatures =

British Company

Original company logo, 1976

Current company logo

Dixon Miniatures is a British company that produces miniature figures for wargaming and role-playing games.

== History ==
Trevor A. Dixon, a sculptor with Hinchcliffe Miniatures, left in 1976 to form his own company, Dixon Miniatures. His first products were 54 mm miniatures for use with Napoleonic wargames. The company then started producing 28 mm figures, including a line of Mongols and historical Japanese figures such as samurai, ashigaru, and ninja.

With the appearance in the late 1970s of role-playing games with historical oriental settings such as Bushido, several reviewers noted that Dixon's line of Japanese figures would work well in these games.

In 1979, Dixon began to produce 25 mm miniatures specifically for role-playing games, including a line of dwarves. Over the next forty years they continued to create new lines to cover many historical periods including Vikings, the Old West, and gangsters of the American Prohibition era.

== Reception ==
In the August 1979 edition of Dragon (Issue 28), Phil Neuscheler noted that Dixon's Japanese figures, distributed in North America by Heritage Models, could be used for fantasy play. Three issues later, Neuscheler again recommended Dixon 25 mm miniatures for use with fantasy role-playing games.

In the August 1983 edition of Imagine, Mike Brunton described the figures as "rather thick-set but cleanly cast and well detailed." He liked the fact that the miniatures came with a variety of weapons, "giving the modeller a good deal of freedom in choosing what the finished product looks like." He concluded, "Although these figures may not seem to be directly relevant to RPG players, they are worth looking at for anyone interested in Bushido or something similar, or someone looking for a fighter with a difference."

Mike Brunton reviewed Dixon's Legends of Nippon series of figures for Imagine magazine, and stated that "Overall: recommended, especially if you are looking for something a bit different."
