= Impact! Miniatures =

Impact Miniatures LTD
- Type: Private
- Industry: Miniature wargaming miniature manufacturer
- Founded: 2006
- Headquarters: Incorporation in Indiana, United States of America
- Key people: Tom Anders (President); Chris Adkerson (Head of Marketing); Ramsay McPherson (Honorary); Gavin Sutton (UK Honorary)
- Products: Elfball; Impact! dice Street Brawl
- Website: http://www.impactminiatures.com/

Impact! Miniatures is a company started in April 2006 by members of the Blood Bowl online community with the aim of producing figures suitable for use with Fantasy Football games such as Elfball, Blood Bowl, Street Brawl, Street Bowl and Deathball.

== Overview ==
Impact! Miniatures was started by gamers to bring products to the market that the Fantasy Football gaming community was requesting but could not get from the larger miniature companies that dominated this market. The company opened for business in the UK on April 24, 2006 and officially opened a branch in the USA on June 1, 2007. Impact! brings a mix of miniatures that they felt were missing from games from full 28 mm figures to conversion sprues to help gamers make better custom pieces. Impact! also aims to help the community by giving an easy outlet for amateur sculptors to have their work cast or for tournament organizers to have their own custom giveaways inexpensively created.

== History ==
The discussion to form Impact! Miniatures in the UK started on November 23, 2005 on the TalkBloodBowl Forums. Earlier, forum member Ewan McKerracher had posted images of a figure he had sculpted for his personal use, representing star player Icepelt Hammerblow for the game Blood Bowl. The sculpt met a positive reception from forum members, who encourage him to have the figure cast in white metal. Instead of contracting to have the figure cast, McKerracher decided to start a new fantasy football miniatures company with the Ice Troll as its flagship figure. Seven members of these discussions joined as partners to form the new company.

The company underwent a series of growing pains getting started. By April 24, 2007, the first anniversary of its founding, the company's partners were reduced to three; McKerracher had stepped down as partner, president, and company sculptor to spend more time with his family; and work was finishing on the paperwork for dual incorporation in both the UK and the USA.

On June 30, 2010, Gavin Sutton sold his profit and voting rights for his partner share to Chris Adkerson. On March 31, 2011, Ramsay McPherson sold his profit and voting rights for his partner share to Chris Adkerson and Tom Anders. Sutton and McPherson remain honorary partners for life in the company with access to the company discussions.

== Company Product Range ==
Impact! offers over 300 different white metal miniatures for use with fantasy football games. As of 2010, Impact! sold more fantasy football figures of their own design than any other miniatures company. Impact! also sells a board games of its own design (Elfball). Impact! also specializes in providing accessories for players of fantasy football games from basing supplies (custom bases, weights, and felt cushions), custom design dice, carry-cases for the football team miniatures, and felt mats to provide easy-to-transport playing surfaces for games.

== Amateur Sculptors and Targeted Impact ==
Impact! Miniatures was the first major miniatures company to offer an ability for amateur sculptors to sell their work under a lifetime commission basis with their Targeted Impact! arrangement. Any sculptor who wishes may submit an image of a sculpted fantasy football miniature that he has created to Impact!. If the Creative Design partner approves the figure then Impact! will cast the figure and add it to the store. The sculptor receives no upfront payment for the sculpture but does receive a 10% commission on any sales of his miniature up to a maximum of $15 USD per mm of sculpt height paid out quarterly . This program has proved very popular and Impact! now offers over 50 different miniatures under this arrangement. Commissions payments as of December 31, 2010 for Targeted Impact! contracts since the program started have totaled over $22000 USD.

== Licensing ==
Impact! Miniatures licenses with Phil Bowen for the entire range of miniatures formally produced by the company Phigs Miniatures. Phil Bowen continues to add to this line with miniatures that he now sells to Impact! Miniatures.

In Fall 2008, Impact! Miniatures licensed with ZN Games to produce their Ulfhedner figure for the Impact! store.

In Winter 2010, Impact! Miniatures licensed with Neomics to produce their Football Human team as Kill Ball teams for the Impact! store.

== Elfball ==
Impact! has purchased the name and basic concept for a fantasy football / rugby game named Elfball from Phil Bowen. A complete version of these rules, turned into a board game, was released at Gen Con 2007 on August 16. The rules are now on their 2nd Edition.

Elfball is now played in tournament play in both the US and UK and rankings are tracked for players for registered events.

The game has been reviewed by Tabletopgamingnews.com which gives a summary of the game and its components and also by Drake's Flames.

== BBFigs.com ==
On March 29, 2008, the three partners of Impact! Miniatures set up a sister company, BBFigs.com. The company was established in response to a change in policy at Games Workshop to sell Blood Bowl fantasy football figures only in boxed team sets of 11 to 12 miniatures. BBFigs.com purchases the boxed sets of Games Workshop Blood Bowl figures, breaks them down and sells them as individual miniatures. To maintain separation between Impact! and Games Workshop, BBFigs was established as a neutral 3rd party company to handle these sales. After legal headaches with Games Workshop on trying to purchase the product and as a statement against the acts of Games Workshop to shut down numerous Blood Bowl fan sites on the internet, the partners agreed to close this spin-off company's doors.

== Dice ==
Impact! Miniatures also manufactures dice with unusual numbers of faces such as D15, D17 D18 or D19. Those dice have been partially financed through Kickstarter campaigns. Their colors match with Chessex opaque colors, and some of them are compatible with Dungeon Crawl Classics RPG. In 2016, dice accounted for 50% of the sales of the company.
