= Cascade impactor =

Device for sizing and collecting aerosol particles

Schematic diagram of a cascade impactor showing particle separation by aerodynamic diameter across progressive nozzle stages

A cascade impactor is an instrument used to sample, fractionate, and collect aerosol particles into discrete size classes based on their aerodynamic diameter. It operates on the principle of inertial impaction through a sequential series of stages. As an air or gas stream is drawn through progressively narrower nozzles, particle velocity increases; particles with sufficient inertia deviate from fluid streamlines to strike and deposit onto collection plates, while smaller particles remain suspended in the flow and proceed to downstream stages.

Cascade impactors are standard tools in atmospheric chemistry, occupational hygiene, air pollution monitoring, and pharmaceutical testing, particularly for the determination of aerodynamic particle size distribution (APSD) in orally inhaled drug products such as metered-dose inhalers (MDIs) and dry-powder inhalers (DPIs).

== Operating principle ==
Cascade impactors fractionate particles according to their aerodynamic behavior rather than geometric dimensions. The aerodynamic diameter ($d_{ae}$) is defined as the diameter of a spherical particle of unit density (1 g/cm^{3}) that exhibits the same settling velocity in air as the particle being evaluated.

=== Mechanics of impaction ===
A constant volumetric flow rate is maintained through the impactor using a downstream vacuum pump. At each stage, the aerosol stream passes through one or more nozzles directed perpendicularly at a flat collection plate. The fluid stream bends abruptly at an angle of 90° to flow around the plate.

Particles possessing high mass or velocity have sufficient inertia to resist the change in streamline direction, causing them to cross streamlines and impact the surface. Smaller or lighter particles remain entrained within the deflected gas stream and travel to the next nozzle stage.

The probability of impaction is characterized non-dimensionally by the Stokes number ($\mathrm{Stk}$): $$\mathrm{Stk} = \frac{\rho_p d_p^2 C_c v}{9 \eta W}$$ where:

- $\rho_p$ is the particle density,
- $d_p$ is particle diameter,
- $C_c$ is the Cunningham correction factor,
- $v$ is mean jet velocity,
- $\eta$ is gas dynamic viscosity,
- $W$ is nozzle diameter or slit width.

Each stage is defined by a cut-off diameter ($d_{50}$), which corresponds to the aerodynamic diameter collected with 50% efficiency. Because nozzle diameters decrease at each successive stage, fluid velocity ($v$) increases, yielding progressively lower $d_{50}$ values.

=== Submicron limitation and low-pressure impactors ===
In standard atmospheric impactors, the lowest achievable cut-off diameter is approximately 0.25 μm to 0.3 μm; reducing nozzle diameters further to achieve higher velocities is restricted by the speed of sound (Mach 1) and excessive compressibility effects.

To size particles in the ultrafine and nanoparticle ranges (<0.1 μm), low-pressure impactors (LPIs) operate their downstream stages at reduced absolute pressure. Decreased pressure elevates the mean free path of gas molecules, drastically increasing the Cunningham slip correction factor ($C_c$) and enabling particle capture down to approximately 10–50 nm without sonic throttling.

== History ==
The concept of inertial impaction was first explored in the early 20th century for spore and dust sampling. In 1942, British physicist K. R. May built the first functional multi-stage cascade impactor at the Chemical Defence Experimental Station (now Dstl Porton Down) to quantify windborne military and biological aerosols. May published details of the four-stage glass apparatus in 1945; it sampled droplets and dust between 1.5 μm and 50 μm onto microscope slides.

In 1958, Ariel A. Andersen introduced the multi-orifice cascade impactor (the Andersen Cascade Impactor), replacing single slits with multi-hole plates to avoid sample overloading and increase collection area. In the late 1990s, a consortium of pharmaceutical manufacturers developed the Next Generation Impactor (NGI) to streamline regulatory testing of inhalers, introducing horizontal planar configurations with automated washing cups.

== Types and designs ==
- Andersen Cascade Impactor (ACI): An 8-stage stacked round-jet impactor, historically calibrated at standard flow rates of 28.3 L/min (1 CFM), with modified stages enabling operation at 60 or 90 L/min for dry powder inhalers.
- Next Generation Impactor (NGI): A high-capacity 7-stage horizontal device widely prescribed in pharmacopoeial monographs. It features removable collection cups and a micro-orifice collector (MOC), operating across volumetric flows from 15 to 100 L/min.
- Multi-Stage Liquid Impinger (MSLI): An impactor configuration using liquid stages to trap particles directly into solvents, preventing particle bounce and facilitating automated chromatographic extraction.
- Electrical Low Pressure Impactor (ELPI): A hybrid real-time instrument combining inertial low-pressure impaction stages with electrometers. Inflowing particles are corona-charged; electrical current readouts at each electrically insulated stage quantify mass concentration and aerodynamic distribution continuously.

== Applications ==
=== Pharmaceutical aerosol testing ===
Under standards specified by the United States Pharmacopeia (USP <601>) and European Pharmacopoeia (Ph. Eur. 2.9.18), cascade impaction is the compulsory reference method for determining the aerodynamic quality of inhalation formulations. Crucial derived metrics include:

- Mass Median Aerodynamic Diameter (MMAD): Aerodynamic size dividing the aerosol population mass in half.
- Geometric Standard Deviation (GSD): Measure of aerosol polydispersity calculated from log-normal cumulative distribution plots.
- Fine Particle Mass (FPM) / Fraction (FPF): Total drug mass contained in particles possessing an aerodynamic diameter $<5.0$ μm, which are capable of reaching the deep pulmonary tracts and alveoli.

=== Ambient air quality and industrial hygiene ===
Cascade impactors fractionate particulate matter in atmospheric monitoring into health-relevant fractions:

- PM10 (inhalable thoracic particles entering the trachea and bronchial tree),
- PM2.5 (respirable particles penetrating the gas-exchange region),
- Ultrafine particles ($<0.1$ μm).

Samples are deposited on filters (e.g., quartz fiber or polytetrafluoroethylene) and assayed gravimetrically, by atomic absorption spectroscopy, or by gas chromatography–mass spectrometry (GC-MS) to quantify chemical species, heavy metals, or polycyclic aromatic hydrocarbons (PAHs).

== Measurement artifacts and limitations ==
- Particle bounce and re-entrainment: Solid, dry particles striking metal collection plates at high velocity can rebound without sticking, causing false readings on downstream finer stages. Mitigated by coating collection plates with silicone oil, glycerol, or grease substrates.
- Wall losses: Particles depositing on inter-stage internal housing walls rather than target collection surfaces. Impactors must be disassembled and rinsed to recover all deposited mass for accurate recovery audits.
- Evaporation and condensation: The adiabatic pressure drop and high local velocities across later nozzle stages can induce sample cooling and drop static pressure, causing volatile or semi-volatile compounds (such as water or organic solvents) to evaporate during sizing.
- Stage overloading: Excessive particulate buildup on collection plates produces piles that alter the nozzle-to-plate distance, modifying the impaction jet geometry and cut-off properties.

== See also ==
- Andersen sampler – Cascade impactor that measures viable bioaerosols
- Aerosol impaction
- Particulate matter sampler
- Stokes number
- Fine particle fraction
