= Aerosol impaction =

Method for removing particles in a gas

In the physics of aerosols, aerosol impaction is the process in which particles are removed from an air stream by forcing the gases to make a sharp bend. Particles above a certain size possess so much momentum that they can not follow the air stream and strike a collection surface, which is available for later analysis of mass and composition. Removal of particles from an air-stream by impaction followed by mass and composition analysis has always been a different approach as to filter sampling, yet has been little utilized for routine analysis because of lack of suitable analytical methods.

== Advantages ==
The most clear and important advantage of impaction, as opposed to filtration, is that two key aerosol parameters, size and composition, can be simultaneously established.

There are many advantages of impaction as a sampling method. For two of the most common configurations, an orifice and an infinite slot, theoretical predictions can be made and empirically verified that give the cuts point and shape of the collection efficiency of an impaction stage. The air stream moves over the sample, not through it as in filtration, reducing desiccation and chemical transformations of the collected sample. Almost complete control of the type of surface on which the particles are impacted is possible, as opposed to the limited choice of filter types. By varying the speed of the air stream and the sharpness of the bend, one can separate particles into numerous size classifications while retaining a sample for analysis.

== Disadvantages ==
There are also several disadvantages to impaction as a sampling method. Only a limited amount of material is available for mass and compositional analysis, as one can not collect more than a few monolayers of particles before particle bounce and mis-sizing are a potential problem.

== See also ==
- Deposition (aerosol physics)
- Cascade impactor
- Aerodynamic Aerosol Classifier
