= Mascara =

Cosmetic for eyelashes

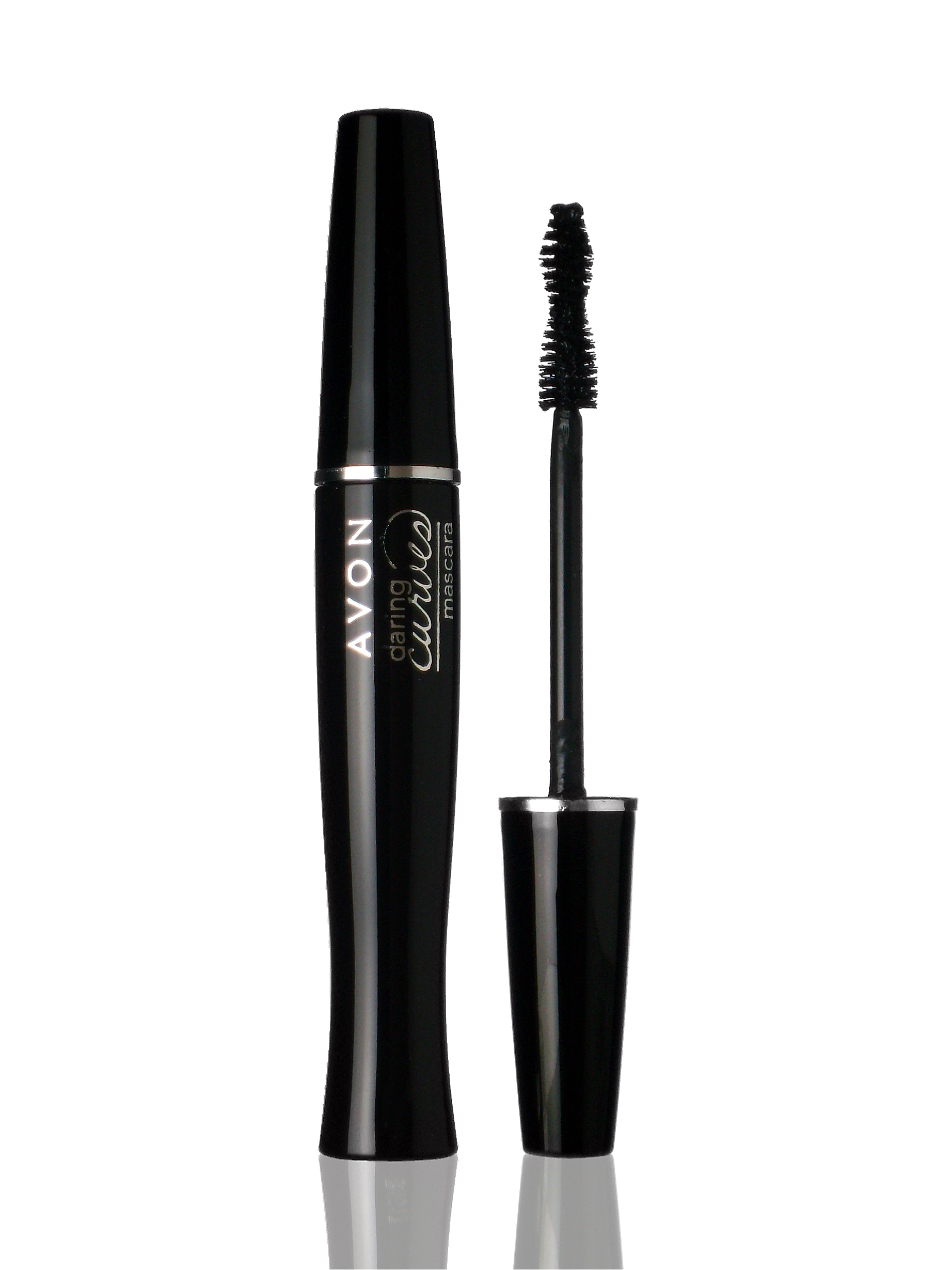
A mascara tube and a wand applicator

Mascara (UK: /məˈskɑːrə/, US: /mæˈskærə/) is a cosmetic commonly used to enhance the upper and lower eyelashes. It is used to darken, thicken, lengthen, and/or define the eyelashes. Normally in one of three forms—liquid, powder, or cream—the modern mascara product has various formulas; however, most contain the same basic components of pigments, oils, waxes, and preservatives. The most common form of mascara is a liquid in a tube with an application brush.

== Definition ==
The Collins English Dictionary defines mascara as "a cosmetic substance for darkening, lengthening, curling, colouring, and thickening the eyelashes, applied with a brush or rod." The Oxford English Dictionary (OED) adds that mascara is occasionally used on the eyebrows as well.

The OED also references mascaro from works published in the late 19th century. In 1886, the Peck & Snyder Catalogue advertises, "Mascaro or Water Cosmetique... For darkening the eyebrow and moustaches without greasing them and making them prominent." In 1890, the Century Dictionary defined mascara as "a kind of paint used for the eyebrows and eyelashes by actors." In 1894, N. Lynn advises in Lynn's Practical Hints for Making-up, "to darken eyelashes, paint with mascara, or black paint, with a small brush."

== Etymology ==
The source of the word mascara is unclear. It was possibly derived from the Spanish word máscara meaning 'mask' or 'stain', and the Italian word maschera meaning 'mask' is a possible origin. A related Catalan word describes soot or a black smear, and the Portuguese word máscara means 'mask' and mascarra means dark stain or smut. There is even some support for a possible source from the Arabic word maskharah or 'buffoon'. The Hebrew word משקרות (in the phrase mesaqqeroth `eynayim) relating to women's eyes is found in Isaiah 3:16. It may mean flirting or ogling with the eyes, or painting them with red pigment.

Latin treatises sometimes used the word mascara when referring to witches.

== History ==
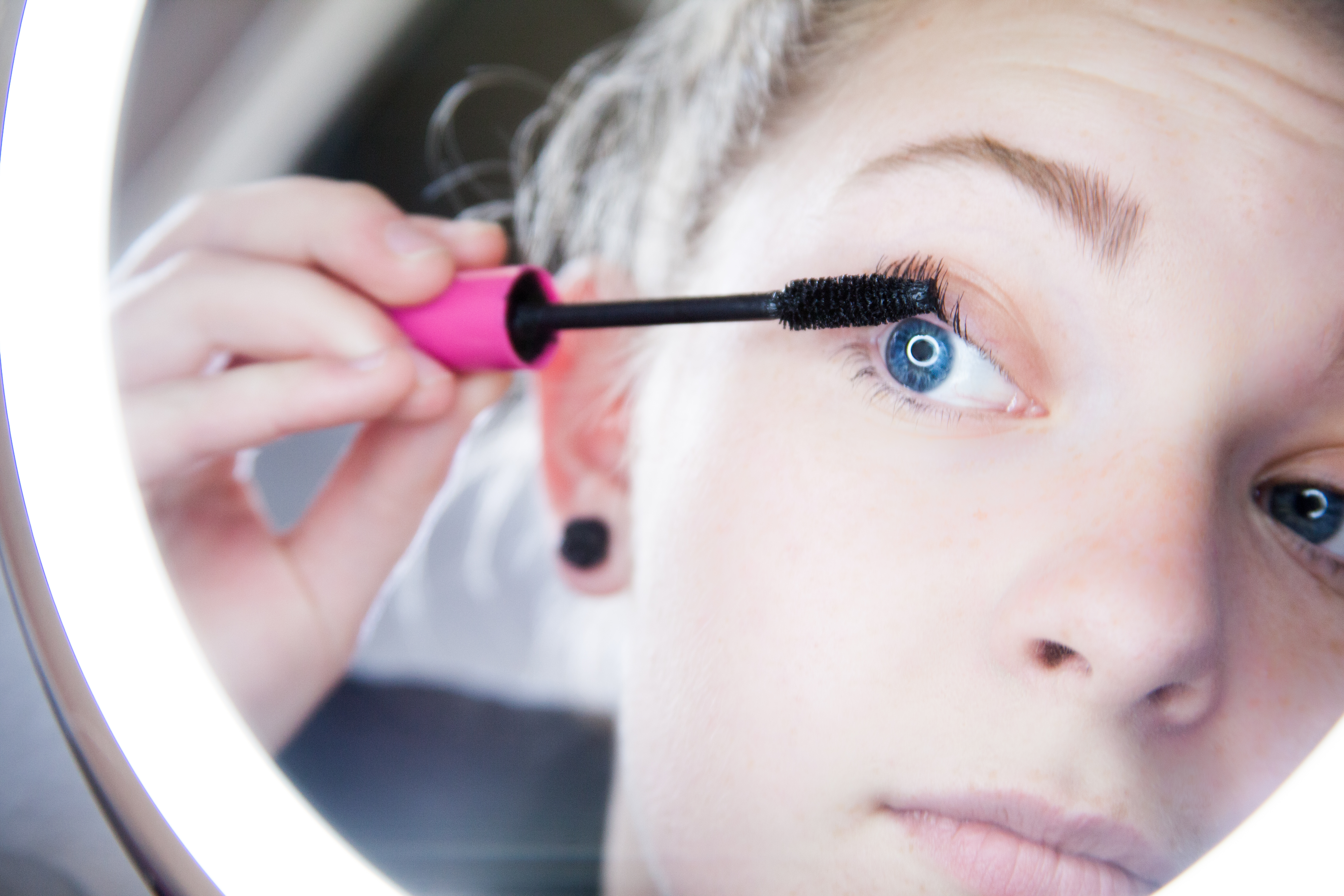
Woman applying mascara.

The name Mascara was likely given in reference to the city which bears the same name, since in the mid-19th century the French discovered antimony powder during their conquest in the old city of Mascara in Algeria. The nomadic tribes used it as a beauty product but also to protect themselves from various trachomas and eye diseases.

Aesthetic adornment is a cultural universal, and mascara can be documented in ancient Egypt. Records from around 4000 BC refer to a substance called kohl that was used to darken eyelashes, eyelids, and eyebrows. Kohl was used to mask the eyes, believed to ward off evil spirits and protect the soul, by both men and women. Often composed of galena; malachite; and charcoal or soot, crocodile stool; honey; and water was added to keep the kohl from running. Through Egypt's influence, kohl usage persisted in the subsequent Babylonian, Greek and Roman empires. Following the fall of the Roman Empire, kohl fell into disuse on the European continent, where it had been considered solely a cosmetic; conversely, it continued to be widely used in the Middle East for religious purposes.

During the Victorian era, social opinion shifted radically towards the promotion of cosmetics, and women were known to spend the majority of their day occupied with beauty regimens. Great efforts were made to create the illusion of long, dark eyelashes. Attempting this, Victorian women made a type of mascara in their own homes. They would heat a mixture of ash or lampblack and elderberry juice on a plate and apply the heated mixture to their eyelashes.

The product that people would recognize as mascara today did not develop until the 19th century. A chemist named Eugène Rimmel developed a cosmetic using the newly invented petroleum jelly. The name Rimmel became synonymous with the substance and still translates to "mascara" in the Portuguese, Spanish, Greek, Turkish, Romanian, and Persian languages today.

Across the Atlantic Ocean and at roughly the same time, in 1915, Thomas Lyle Williams created a remarkably similar substance for his sister Mabel. In 1917 he started a mail-order business from the product that grew to become the company Maybelline.

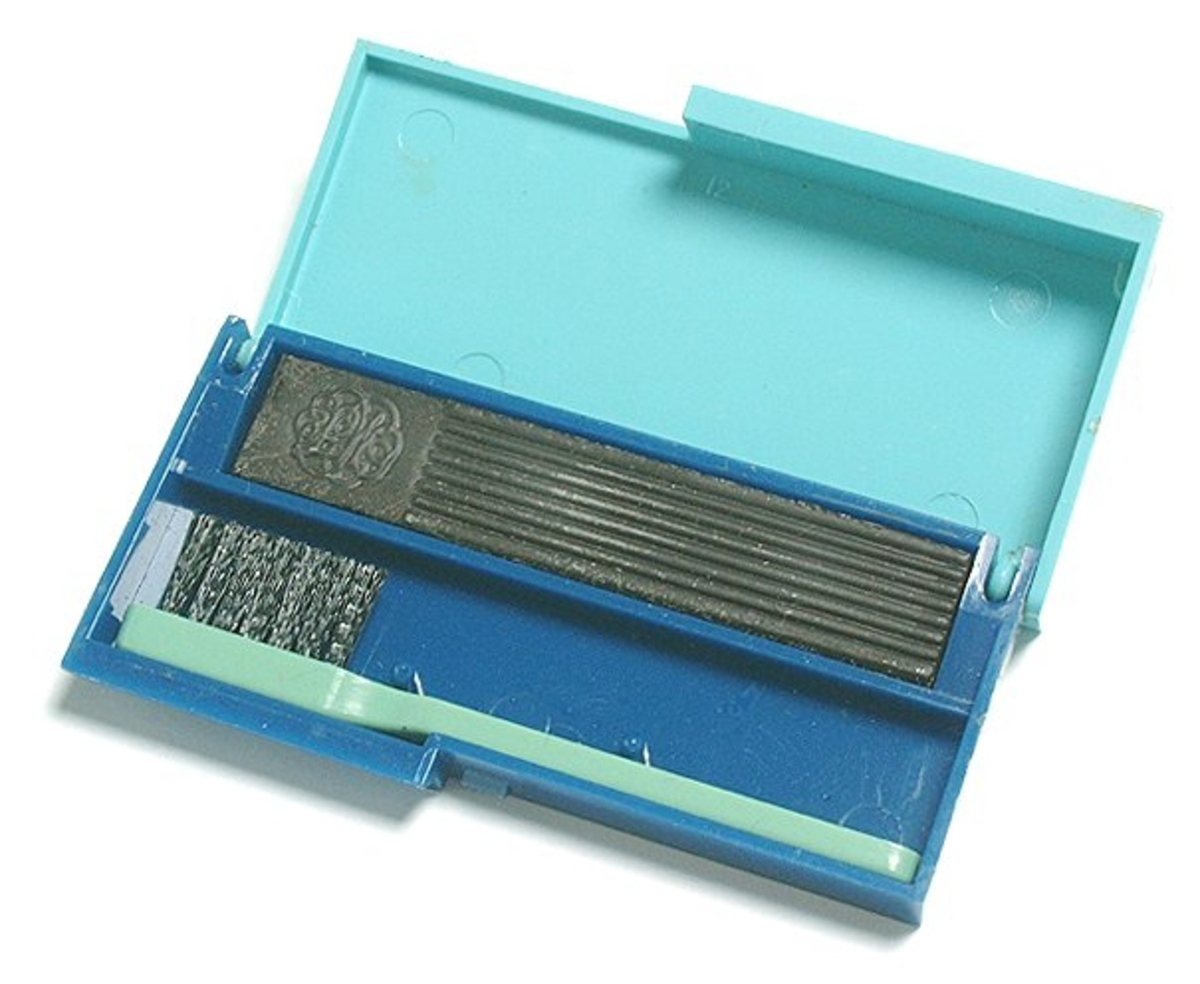
Max Factor cake mascara with brush, 1960

The mascara developed by these two men consisted of petroleum jelly and coal in a set ratio. It was undeniably messy, and a better alternative was soon developed. A dampened brush was rubbed against a cake containing soap and black dye in equal proportions and applied to the lashes. Still it was extremely messy. Frustrated by the low quality of existing products and their susceptibility to become runny when exposed to water or sweat, the Viennese opera singer Helene Winterstein-Kambersky developed a water-proof creme mascara, which was patented in 1935 and is still sold today ("La Bella Nussy"). Four years later, Helena Rubinstein started using the same recipe under license and in 1958 she created the first refillable mascara in a tube with an integrated brush for easy application ("Mascara Matic").

The events leading to Rubinstein's improvement began in Paris in the early 20th century. There, at the fashion capital of the world, mascara was quickly gaining popularity and common usage. Elizabeth Arden and Helena Rubinstein, two giants in the American beauty industry, watched and kept abreast of its development. After the First World War, American consumers became eager for new products. Sensing an opportunity, both Rubinstein and Arden launched their own brands of cosmetics that included mascara. Through the efforts of these two rivals and public temperament, mascara finally gained respectability and favor in American society.

The invention of the photograph and motion picture launched mascara's popularity and usage further forward in America. Motion pictures especially advertised a new standard of beauty and sex appeal. Famous actresses of the classic cinema era, such as Theda Bara, Pola Negri, Clara Bow, Greta Garbo, Marlene Dietrich, Bette Davis, and Jean Harlow, depended heavily upon mascara for their glamorized appearances, which the average woman sought to mimic.

In 1933, a woman known on court records as Mrs. Brown consented to have her eyelashes permanently dyed. Unfortunately, the product, Lash Lure, used para-phenylenediamine, a chemical extremely toxic to the body, as the dyeing agent. At the time, cosmetics were unregulated by the Federal Drug Administration, and the dangers of paraphenylenediamine were unknown. Within hours of the treatment, Mrs. Brown began experiencing severe symptoms of stinging and burning eyes. By the next morning, Mrs. Brown's eyes had developed ulcers which oozed and had swollen shut. Use of Lash Lure resulted in blindness in Mrs. Brown and fifteen other women and also caused the death of another through a bacterial infection. It was only after the Lash Lure incident and several others like it, documented in Ruth deForest Lamb's book entitled American Chamber of Horrors, that Congress granted the Food and Drug Administration (FDA) the right to regulate cosmetics in 1938.

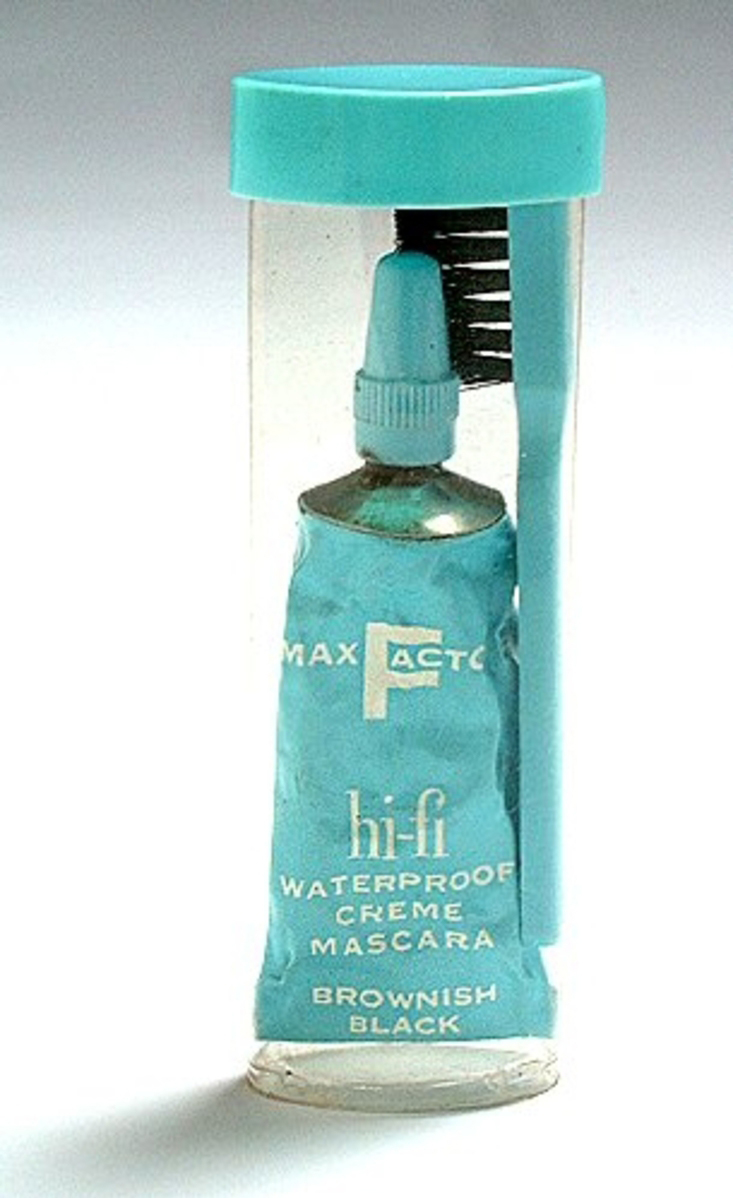
Max Factor waterproof mascara creme in a tube with a brush, 1960

Years later, in 1957, Rubinstein created a formula that evolved mascara from a hard cake into a lotion-based cream. She packaged the new mascara in a tube to be sold with a brush. For use, the cream was squeezed onto the brush and applied to lashes. Although still messy, it was a step towards the modern mascara product.

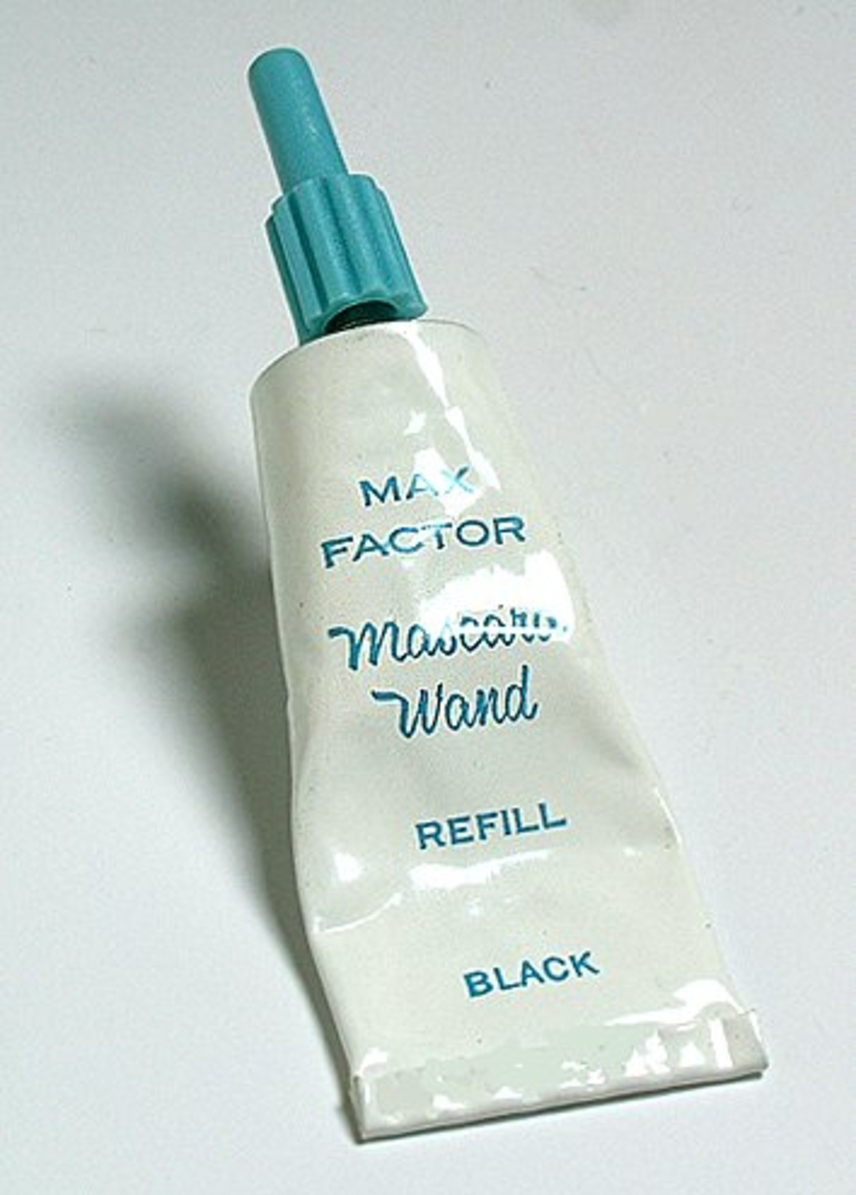
Refill tube with Max Factor Mascara Wand cream, 1961, for containers with a grooved rod.

Soon, a grooved rod was patented. This device picked up the same amount of mascara for each use. Then the grooved rod was altered to the brush similar to the ones used today. The change in applicator led to mascara being even easier to use, and its popularity increased.

Some mascara formulations include conditioning ingredients such as panthenol and other hair-care additives. Tubing mascaras use film-forming polymers that create a coating around individual lashes.

=== Ingredients and manufacture ===
All formulations contain pigments, oils, and waxes.

=== Cosmetic pigments ===
The pigmentation for black mascara is similar to that used by the Egyptians and Victorian women. Black and brown mascaras are typically colored by the use of iron oxides. Some mascaras contain ultramarine blue.

Mascara is composed of a base mixture of pigments, waxes, and oils with varying supporting components. Mascara pigments most commonly include iron oxides and titanium dioxide, which provide mascara with its desired color. Titanium dioxide (TiO_{2}) accounts for over 65% of inorganic pigment sales volume. TiO_{2} gives the pigment a white color while different iron oxides provide a variety of colors such as red, yellow, brown, and black. The particle size of opaque pigments ranges from 0.2 to 0.3 μm.

=== Oils, waxes, etc. ===
Among the many oils used, linseed oil, castor oil, eucalyptus oil, lanolin, and oil of turpentine are found frequently. Sesame oil is also commonly used. Waxes usually found in mascara are paraffin wax, carnauba wax, and beeswax.

The desired effects of the mascara account for most variations of ingredients. Water-resistant mascaras require hydrophobic ingredients, like dodecane. Non-water-resistant mascaras have water-soluble base ingredients. Mascaras designed to lengthen or curl the eyelashes often contain nylon or rayon microfibers. Additionally, ceresin, gum tragacanth, and methyl cellulose are regular ingredients and serve as stiffeners.

=== Manufacture ===
Mascara is often used daily around the world. In 2016 alone, U.S. consumers spent US$335.6 million on the top 10 leading mascara brands.

In one method of production, referred to as anhydrous, all waxes, oils, and pigments are mixed, heated, and agitated simultaneously. The alternative method, termed emulsion, starts by combining water and thickeners. Separately, waxes and emulsifiers are combined. Pigment is then added individually to both mixtures. Finally, all is combined in a homogenizer, which acts as a high-speed agitator in order to thoroughly mix the oils, water, waxes, and emulsifiers—ingredients that naturally repulse each other.

Mascara has a shelf life of two to four months.

== Safety ==
Eye cosmetics containing kohl, kajal, al-kahal, surma, tiro, tozali, or kwalli often pose a lead poisoning risk. Products containing kohl, kajal, surma, and similar materials are illegal color additives in the United States as defined by the Federal Food, Drug and Cosmetic Act, section 201(t).

Mercury, as thiomersal, is widely used in the manufacture of mascara. In 2008, Minnesota became the first state in the United States to ban intentionally added mercury in cosmetics, giving it a tougher standard than the federal government.

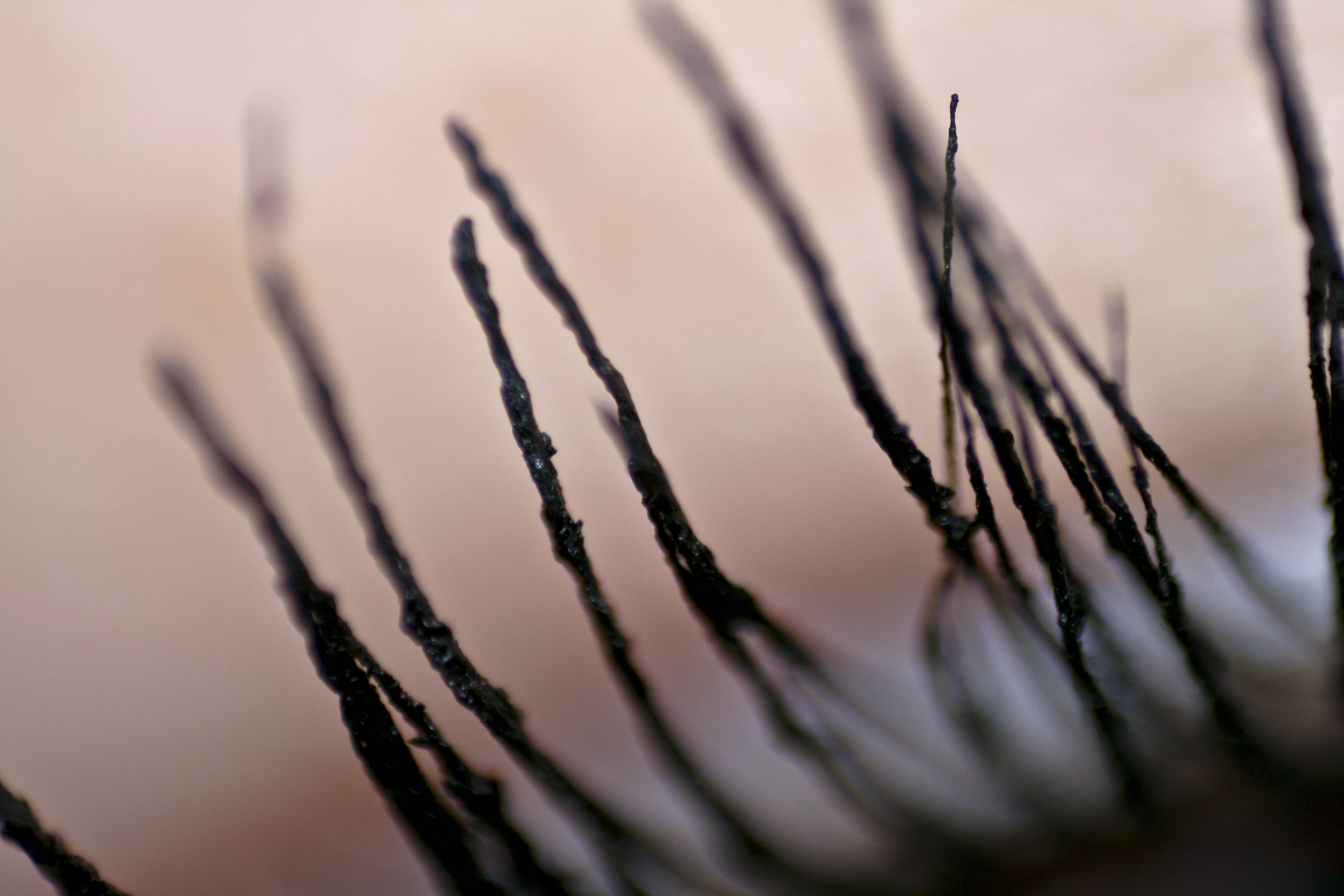
Mascara-coated eyelashes

It is more common to develop a stye, or commoner still, swollen eyelids. Styes and swollen eyelids are better classified as allergic reactions. The allergic reactions can be stimulated by any of the components of mascara but is usually attributed to methylparaben, aluminum powder, ceteareth-20, butylparaben, or benzyl alcohol.

If not cleaned properly, mascara can deposit itself under the conjunctiva in the form of black lumps. Eyelashes naturally have microbial organisms; applying mascara may expose microbes to incubate in the mascara.

=== Per- and polyfluoroalkyl substances (PFAS) ===
A 2021 study tested 231 makeup and personal care products and found organic fluorine, an indicator of PFAS, in more than half of the samples. High levels of fluorine were most commonly identified in waterproof mascara (82% of brands tested), foundations (63%), and liquid lipstick (62%). As many as 13 types of individual PFAS compounds were found in each product. Since PFAS compounds are highly mobile, they are readily absorbed through human skin and through tear ducts, and such products on lips are often unwittingly ingested. Manufacturers often fail to label their products as containing PFAS, which makes it difficult for cosmetics consumers to avoid products containing PFAS.

== See also ==
- Eye liner
- Eye shadow
