= Emulsified fuel =

Emulsions composed of water and a combustible liquid

Emulsified fuels are a type of emulsion that combines water with a combustible liquid, such as oil or fuel. An emulsion is a specialized form of dispersion that contains both a continuous phase and a dispersed phase. The most commonly utilized emulsified fuel is a water-in-diesel emulsion (also known as hydrodiesel). In these emulsions, the two phases are immiscible liquids—water and oil.

Emulsified fuels can be categorized as either microemulsions or conventional emulsions (sometimes called macroemulsions to distinguish them from microemulsions). The main differences between these types are related to stability and particle size. Microemulsions are thermodynamically stable, forming spontaneously with particle sizes of 10 to 200 nm. In contrast, macroemulsions are kinetically stabilized, created through a shearing process, with particle sizes ranging from 100 nm to over 1 micrometer. While microemulsions are isotropic, macroemulsions may undergo settling (or creaming) over time and experience changes in particle size. Both types use surfactants (also known as emulsifiers) and can be water-in-oil (inverted emulsions), oil-in-water (regular emulsions), or bicontinuous (also called multiple or complex emulsions).

== Applications ==
Oil-in-water emulsified fuels, such as the Orimulsion system and bitumen emulsions, are examples of water-continuous systems. These emulsions are often considered high internal phase emulsions (HIPE) because the continuous phase makes up about 30% of the fuel composition, whereas the dispersed phase is usually the minor component. Emulsions of heavy crude oils and bitumen are easier to pump than their original forms, which typically require heating or dilution with light oils like kerosene to facilitate handling. Emulsions of residual fuels, including heavy fuel oils used in industrial applications, can also be created to reduce the reliance on cutter fluids and improve combustion emissions from lower-quality fuels.

Water-in-oil emulsified fuels, such as diesel and biodiesel-water emulsions, are widely used in Europe, with standards established by the CEN workshop (CWA 15145:2004). These emulsions usually contain between 5% and 30% water by mass. Water-in-diesel emulsions can serve as alternative fuels, offering lower emissions and improved brake thermal efficiency.

Since 2006, Nonox Ltd. has offered on-demand water-in-fuel emulsions for heavy fuel oil (HFO) and diesel, used in shipping and stationary boilers. This approach, known as Emulsion to Combustion (E2C), allows for mixing without chemical surfactants, the adjustment of the water-to-fuel ratio based on load, and prevents separation during storage. This system has demonstrated reductions in soot emissions of up to 90% and NOx emissions by 40%, while also delivering fuel savings depending on baseline efficiency.

Microemulsions of fuels have been prepared using specific types of surfactants, which differentiate them from other commercial emulsion fuels. These microemulsions are often utilized in contexts where safety (e.g., fire prevention;) or enhanced commercial returns (e.g., improved oil recovery using surfactant flooding;) justify the additional costs.

== Theory ==
The main benefits of using emulsified fuels instead of conventional fuels include environmental and economic advantages. Introducing water into the combustion process reduces temperatures and NO_{x} emissions. Research comparing water injection and emulsified fuels in diesel engines (both marine and stationary) has shown that emulsified fuels are particularly effective at simultaneously decreasing NO_{x} and particulate matter emissions. Additional studies have investigated the impact of exhaust gas recirculation (EGR) and emulsion fuels on diesel engines.

== See also ==
- Emulsions – Mixture of two or more immiscible liquids
- Emulsion dispersion – Thermoplastics or elastomers suspended in a liquid state by means of emulsifiers
- Microemulsion – Thermodynamically stable, isotropic mixture of oil, water, and surfactant
- Miniemulsion – Particular type of emulsion
- Pickering emulsion – Type of emulsion
- Water-in-water emulsion
