= Gelatin microparticle =

Gelatin Microparticles are polymer microparticles constructed of gelatin. Gelatin, a biopolymer, is produced through the hydrolysis of collagen. Gelatin, along with its more familiar uses, is widely used for the production of microparticles due to its efficiency in forming gels as well as its biodegradability as a particle. Gelatin can be manipulated to form a stable matrix for biologically reactive compounds, allowing for the incorporation and protection against enzymatic degradation. Gelatin Microparticles are versatile particles and are easily loadable for the use within drug systems and alongside growth factors post-synthesis. Gelatin microparticles also allow for the biochemically controlled release of drug particles, growth factors, and other biological molecules.

== Production ==
There are multiple production protocols used to synthesize gelatin microparticles. These production protocols include spray drying, precipitation, solvent evaporation, and emulsification. Water in water (w/w) emulsification is the most popular method of production. W/w was developed in order to address the loss of parrtical-product bioactivity which is associated with chemically induced preparation.

== Applications ==
Gelatin microparticles have an array of applications in research science due to their biocompatibility and controlled release systems. Both factors have attracted much interest and attention. Gelatin microparticles have been used to encapsulate growth factors, such as TGF-β1-3, into delivery systems as well as served as microcarriers for chondrocyte expansion. Gelatin microparticles have also been incorporated to form 3D scaffolding systems through aggregation in vitro while also performing known use as a molecule delivery system. With the use of radioactively labeled growth factors, gelatin microparticles release kinetics can be altered, as was done through varied release groups of BMP-2 over four week intervals. Gelatin microparticles also serve as enhancers of calcium deposition, which serves as an indicator of tissue regeneration.

== See also ==
- Hydrogels
- Microparticles
- Nanoparticles
