= Reconstituted meat =

Liquefied meat product

A reconstituted meat, meat slurry, or emulsified meat is a liquefied meat product that contains fewer fats, pigments and less myoglobin than unprocessed dark meats. Meat slurry is more malleable than dark meats and eases the process of meat distribution as pipelines may be used. Reconstituted meat products are considered ultra-processed food.

Meat slurry is not designed to sell for general consumption; rather, it is used as a meat supplement in food products for humans, such as chicken nuggets, and food for domestic animals. Poultry is a common meat slurry. Beef and pork are also used.

== Properties and production ==
The characteristics of dark meat from poultry (such as its color, low plasticity, and high fat content) are caused by myoglobin, a pigmented chemical compound found in muscle tissue that undergoes frequent use. Because domestic poultry rarely fly, the flight muscles in the breast contain little myoglobin and appear white. Dark meat which is high in myoglobin is less useful in industry, especially fast food, because it is difficult to mold into shapes. Processing dark meat into a slurry makes it more like white meat, easier to prepare.

The meat is first finely ground and mixed with water. The mixture is then used in a centrifuge or with an emulsifier to separate the fats and myoglobin from the muscle. The product is then allowed to settle into three layers: meat, excess water, and fat. The remaining liquefied meat is then flash-frozen and packaged.

== See also ==
- Meat emulsion
- Mechanically separated meat
- Offal
- Pink slime
- Surimi
