= Surfactants in paint =

Paint has four major components: pigments, binders, solvents, and additives. Pigments serve to give paint its color, texture, toughness, as well as determining if a paint is opaque or not. Common white pigments include titanium dioxide and zinc oxide. Binders are the film forming component of a paint as it dries and affects the durability, gloss, and flexibility of the coating. Polyurethanes, polyesters, and acrylics are all examples of common binders. The solvent is the medium in which all other components of the paint are dissolved and evaporates away as the paint dries and cures. The solvent also modifies the curing rate and viscosity of the paint in its liquid state. There are two types of paint: solvent-borne and water-borne paints. Solvent-borne paints use organic solvents as the primary vehicle carrying the solid components in a paint formulation, whereas water-borne paints use water as the continuous medium. The additives that are incorporated into paints are a wide range of things which impart important effects on the properties of the paint and the final coating. Common paint additives are catalysts, thickeners, stabilizers, emulsifiers, texturizers, biocides to fight bacterial growth, etc.

The word surfactant is short for surface active agent. Surfactants are compounds that lower the surface tension of a liquid, the interfacial tension between two liquids, or the interfacial tension between a liquid and a solid. In solutions this behavior is known as wetting, and it occurs as a result of surfactants adsorbing to the air/water interface. Soluble surfactants are also capable of forming micelles and other aggregate structures in solution, leading to a stabilizing effect in latex paints. Surfactants in paint are used to change many end properties of a dried paint, as well as to emulsify paints in their liquid state.

== Role of surfactants in paint ==
% TiO_{2} by volume	Modulus of Elasticity (MPa)	Modulus of Elasticity: Surfactant Removed (MPa)
0	8.9	6.0
13	22.9	22.4
25	60.2	89.1
38	169.8	416.8
Elasticity of a latex paint is affected by presence of surfactant. Note the effect changes dependent on TiO_{2} concentration.

=== Positive Effects ===
Surfactants affect a wide array of physical properties in paints. Surfactants affect the behavior of a paint not only during the lifetime of the formed coating but also the initial aggregation and film formation of the paint. Surfactants are also used to stabilize the dispersion of polymer particles during emulsion polymerization in paints and other applications. The mechanical stability, freeze-thaw stability and shelf-life of paints are all improved by the addition of surfactants. The addition of surfactants to paint also allow the paint to coat a surface more easily because surfactants increase the wetting of a solution.

=== Negative Effects ===
The addition of surfactants does not always have a positive effect on all properties. The water resistance of the coating can be decreased with surfactant addition since surfactants can be very water-soluble and will easily wash out of a coating. This problem of moisture resistance is particularly prevalent problem for art conservation, as well as problems with adhesion, loss of optical clarity, and dirt pickup caused by polyether surfactants in contemporary acrylic emulsion used in artworks bearing acrylic coats. While the type and amount of surfactant determine what properties will be affected, other chemicals in a paint can alter the overall effect the surfactants may have on the paint. Elasticity has been found to either increase or decrease in latex paints depending on the amount of TiO_{2} present.

=== Emulsification ===
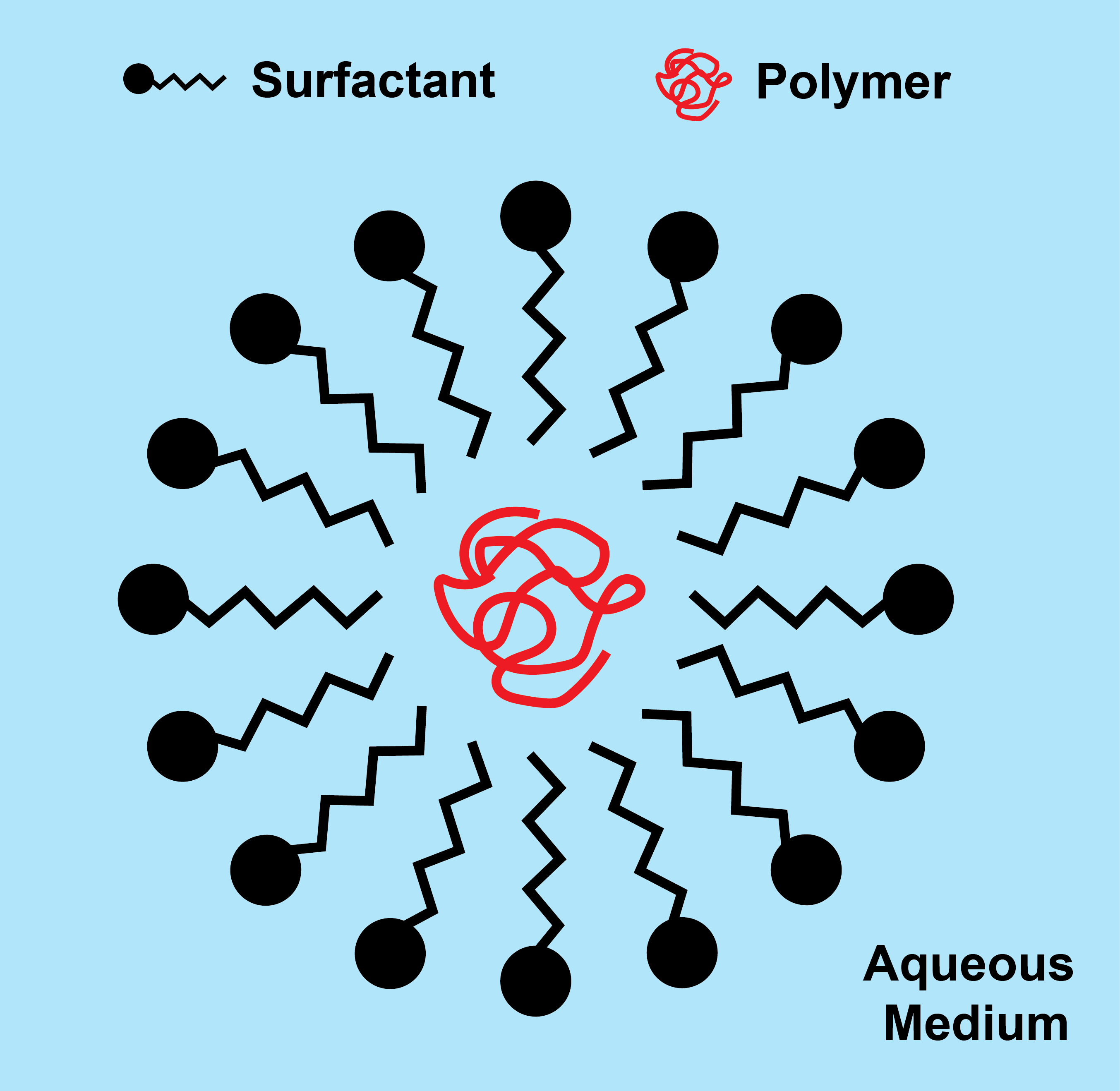
A surfactant micelle around a polymer chain.

Latex paints (emulsion paints British English, not to be confused with latex rubber) are an emulsion of polymer particles dispersed in water. Macroemulsions in latex paint are inherently unstable and phase separate, so surfactants are added to lower interfacial tension and stabilize polymer particles to prevent demulsification.

Anionic surfactants such as sodium dodecyl sulfate are most commonly used for stabilizing emulsions because of their affinity for hydrogen bonding with the aqueous medium. Nonionic surfactants are rarely used alone due to their inferior efficiency in creating stable emulsions in comparison to anionic surfactants. Because of this, non-ionic surfactants are usually used in tandem with anionic surfactants and impart a second method of colloidal stabilization through steric interference of the van der Waals forces amid polymer and pigment particles. Latexes that require stability over large pH ranges use larger nonionic to anionic surfactant ratios. Cationic surfactants are least commonly used because of their high cost, inefficient emulsifying capability, and undesirable effects on initiator decomposition. High speed application, low temperature storage, shear stresses from pumping, and other extreme storage or application conditions can cause the failure of a surfactant to adequately stabilize a paint dispersion.

The thermodynamic explanation for demulsification is the gain in Gibbs Free Energy resulting from lowering the total area of high energy surface interactions.

$$\Delta G_{\text{em}}=\gamma{3V\ \over R}$$

The energy gained from demulsification is dependent on the total area of interface and the surface tension of that interface. Surfactants lower the surface tension (γ) and thus gibbs energy is gained from demulsification. This slows the process of demulsification and stabilizes the latex paint.

The size of the droplets of dispersed polymer in a latex paint can be modeled with the following equation:

$$R={3L_{\text{s}}\phi_{\text{d}} \over \phi_{\text{s}}}$$

The radius of a droplet in the emulsion is dependent on surfactant length, L_{s}, volume fraction of dispersed phase, φ_{d}, and volume fraction of surfactant, φ_{s}.

== Classification of surfactants ==
There are three main categories of surfactants used in paint —ionic, polymeric and electrosteric.

=== According to head group composition ===
Sodium Dodecyl Sulfate, a common anionic surfactant.

The head group classification of a surfactant is determined by the head group ion type. Ionic surfactants derive their amphiphilicity from a charged hydrophilic head group and tend to be small, low molecular weight molecules. Ionic surfactants will stabilize particles suspended in a paint by electrostatic repulsion and are easily adsorbed and desorbed from a surface due to their small size.

Anionic head groups are negatively charged, and commonly used in cleaning products. Anionic surfactants can be found in products such as shampoos, laundry detergents, and soaps because of their ability to remove dirt from soft mediums such as fabric. Anionic surfactants are easily suspended in water due to the polarity of the charged head group. However, hard water can deactivate the molecule. Some of the more commonly used anionic head groups are sulfates and ethoxylates.

Cationic head groups have a positive charge and cationic surfactants are used in several different applications. One common use for cationic surfactants is in fabric softeners. Cationic head groups are also added to laundry detergent in conjunction with anionic surfactants because they help to improve the dirt removal properties of the anionic surfactants. Cationic head groups also increase the disinfecting properties of household cleaners. Some common cationic surfactants head groups include amines and quaternary ammonium ions. Among the many types of surfactants, cationic surfactants are very useful corrosion inhibitors due to their protective effectiveness in neutral and acidic media.

Nonionic head groups have no charge and they function very well as grease removers. Nonionic surfactants are commonly used in detergents, soaps, and household cleaners. In solutions of hard water, nonionic surfactants are used to help limit the deactivation of ionic surfactants caused by the calcium and magnesium ions. Some common nonionic surfactant head groups include fatty acids and glycols.

=== According to tail composition ===
Hydrocarbon chains are long chains which consist of a carbon backbone hydrogen substituents, making them very hydrophobic. Hydrocarbon chains alone form waxes and oils and retain these characteristics when they are incorporated into surfactant. A good example of surfactants containing a hydrocarbon chain are lipids, which form cell membranes.

Alkyl ether chains are similar to hydrocarbon chains, except with oxygens incorporated within the backbone as well as carbons. There are two alkyl chains commonly used in surfactants: polyethylene oxide and polypropylene oxide. Polyethylene oxide chains have an oxygen and two carbon (-O-CH_{2}-CH_{2}-)_{n} repeating unit and has an increased hydrophilic character compared to hydrocarbons. Polypropylene oxide has the same backbone structure as polyethylene oxide but with a methyl group substituent of one of the carbons, and this structure has hydrophobicity between hydrocarbons and polyethylene oxides.

Fluorocarbon chain tails consist of a carbon backbone that has fluorine substituents instead of hydrogens. Fluorocarbons help to lower the surface tension of water and other solvents because of their lipophobic nature even in harsh conditions such as low pH. When fluorocarbons are incorporated into surfactants they are used as stain repellents and incorporated into coatings in order to decrease surface defects.

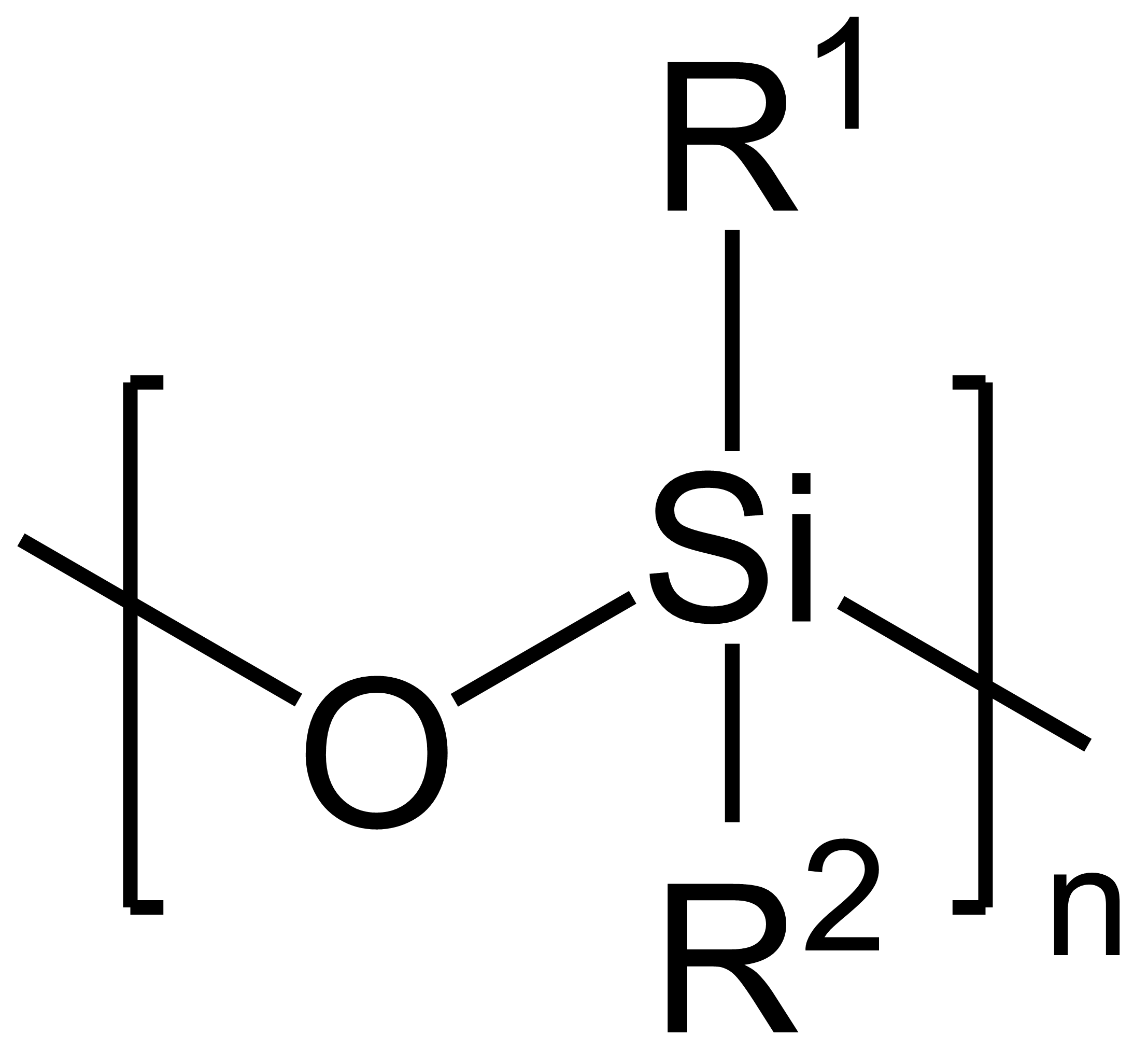
Silicon - Oxygen bonds resist chain breakdown from hydrolysis and will prevent cracking in paints.

Siloxane chains consist of a backbone which contains alternating oxygen and silicon atoms. Surfactants with siloxane tails have been found to resist hydrolysis and prevent breakdown polymer chains which can cause cracking in the paint and are thus used in products such as cosmetics, deodorants, defoamer, and soap.

== Problems with surfactant use ==
=== Environmental issues ===
Surfactants can destabilize toxic organic compounds in paint which can enter the environment and have negative effects. Water-soluble surfactants can wash out of dried paints and enter the environment. Some of these surfactants are directly toxic to animals and the environment as well as increase the ability of other toxic contaminants present to enter the environment.

=== Cost ===
The cost of surfactants is partially dependent on the crude oil market. As a stock ingredient for production of surfactants, paints highly dependent on surfactants will be affected by this market. More intricate surfactants with larger, more difficult to synthesize structure are more expensive to produce and have a greater effect on end market price of their applications. As a result, simple, easy to produce and more environmentally friendly surfactants are used more widely.

== See also ==
- Surfactant leaching
