= Kipcorn =

Dutch snack bar meal/delicatesse

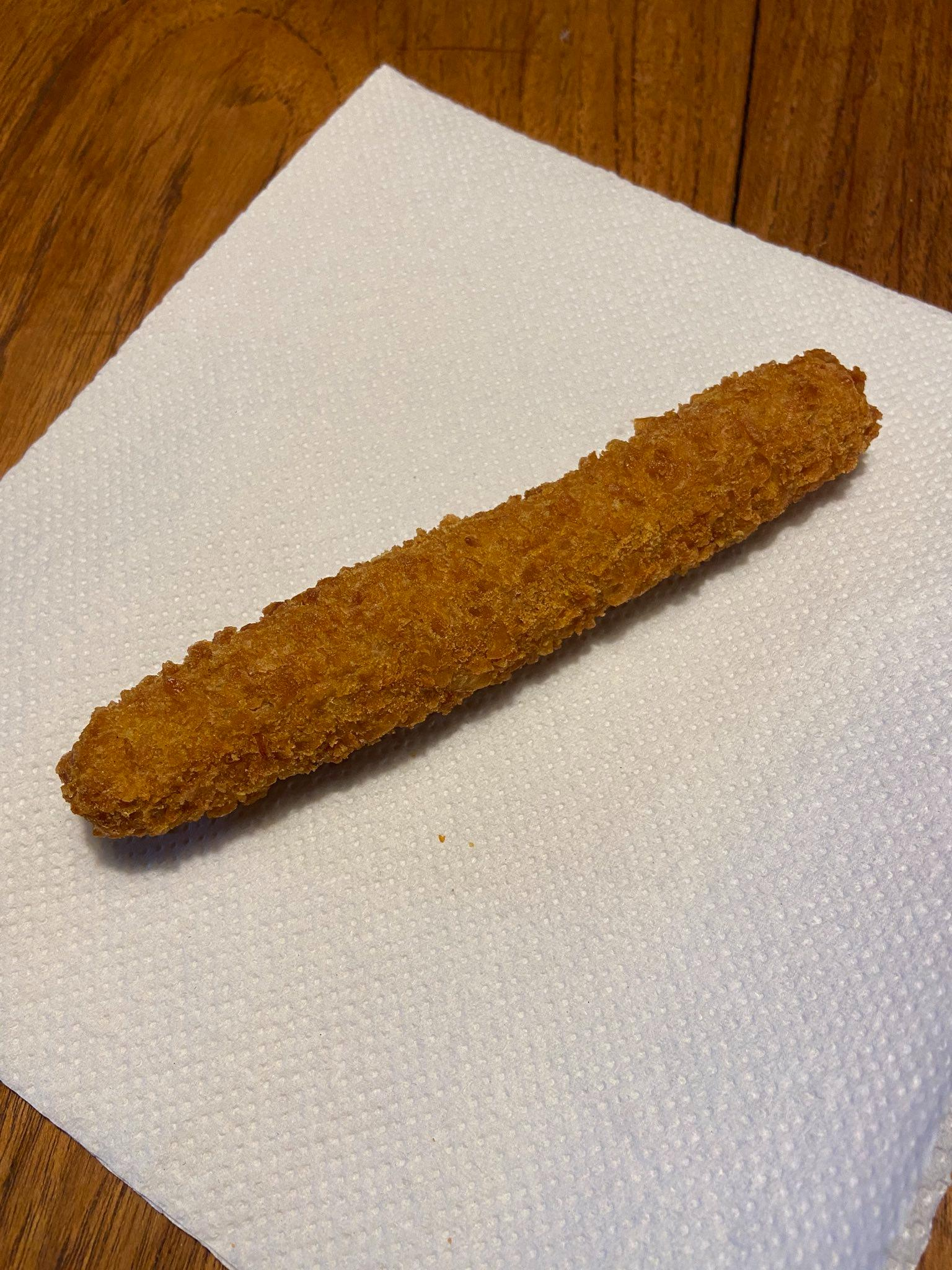
Kipcorn

Kipcorn ([kɪpkɔrn]) is a deep-fried food item from the Netherlands among the most common snacks in Dutch fast food restaurants, along with frikandels and krokets.

Kipcorns are rod-shaped and consist of a chicken or turkey meat slurry, breaded with a crust of corn or breadcrumbs. It is deep-fried and served hot. A classic kipcorn is usually served with ketchup, mayonnaise or curry sauce.
