= Eugène Rimmel =

Perfumer, cosmetics manufacturer (1820-1887)

Eugene Rimmel
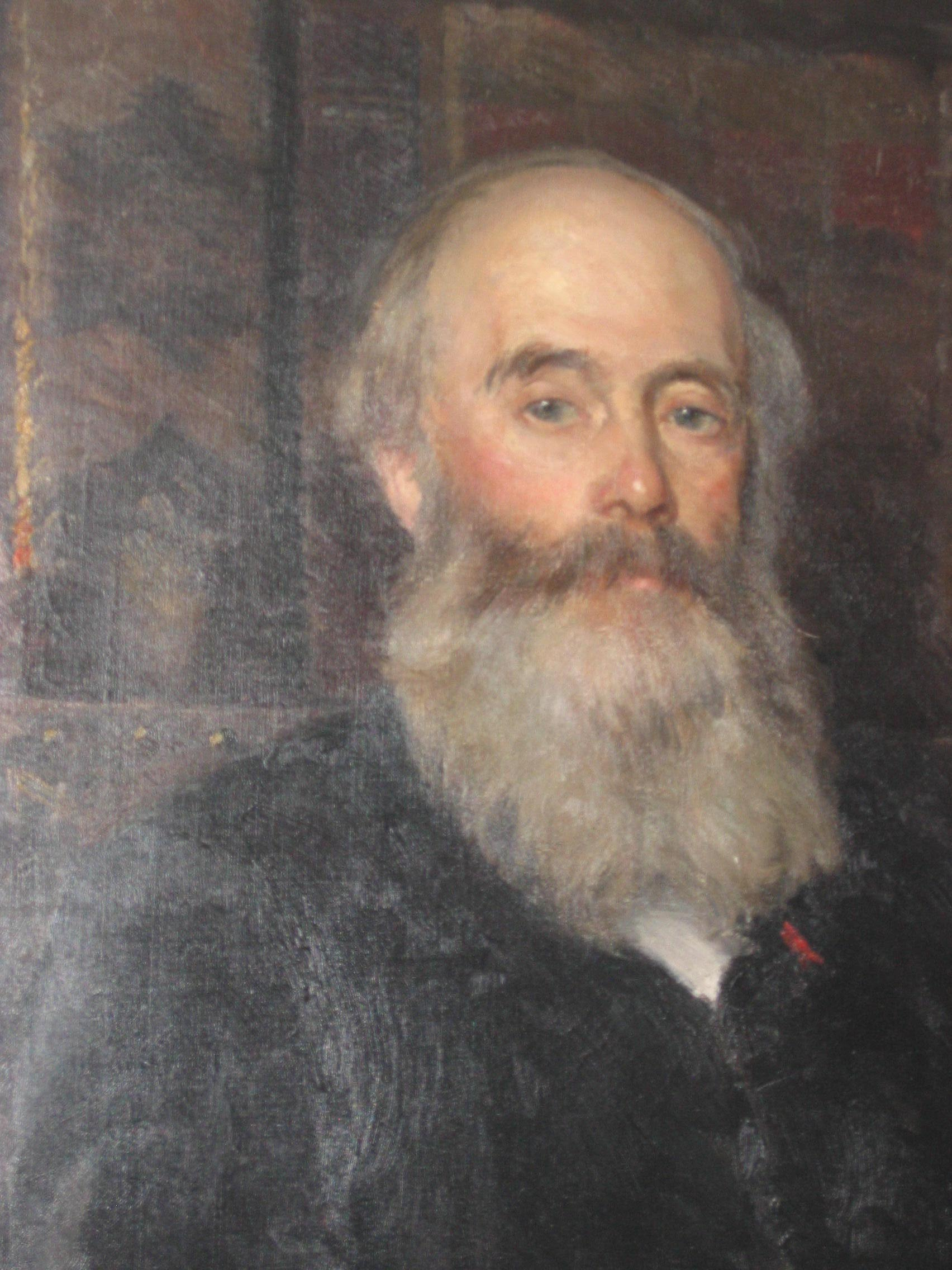
- Contemporary portrait in oils of Rimmel
- Born: c. 1820; France
- Died: 1887 (aged 66–67)
- Occupations: Perfumer, cosmetics entrepreneur
- Known for: Founder of House of Rimmel

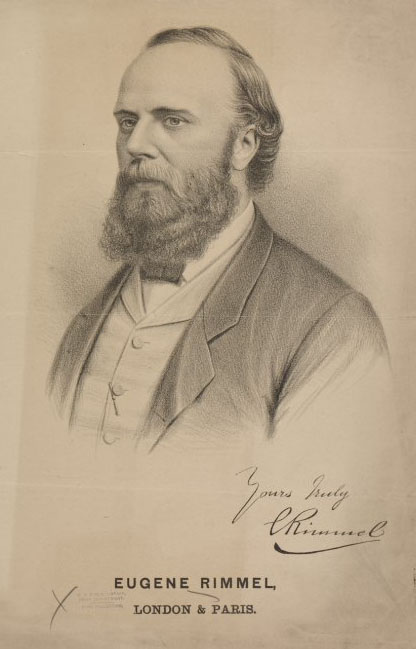
Eugène Rimmel

Eugène Rimmel (c. 1820–1887) was a French-born British perfumer and businessman, responsible for manufacturing and marketing some of the earliest commercially made cosmetics, through his company House of Rimmel, (now a division of Coty Inc.).

== Early life and career ==
Rimmel was born in France, he moved with his family to London when his father accepted an invitation to manage a perfumery on Bond Street.

Rimmel was apprenticed to his father. In 1834, he opened his own perfumery, the House of Rimmel. In the same year father and son produced their first cosmetic products. By the age of 24, Eugène Rimmel had become an immensely talented perfumer and cosmetics innovator. Considered by many beauty historians as a trail-blazer of the beauty and healthcare industries, Rimmel contributed greatly to the concept of hygiene and bathing. He was also among the first to develop scented pomades, mouth rinses and his signature "Toilet Vinegar".

His most innovative invention may well be the first commercial non-toxic mascara, which became so popular that "rimmel" is to this day the word for "mascara" in several languages including French, Italian, Portuguese, Persian, Romanian, Spanish, Turkish and Arabic.

Rimmel was also considered an exceptional marketer and produced detailed mail order catalogues and advertising programmes with English theatres.

== Publication ==
In 1865, he published The Book of Perfumes, which appeared in 1870 in a French translation (Le Livre des Parfums) with a preface by Alphonse Karr.

== Later life ==
Rimmel was so successful that he was granted ten Royal Warrants from heads of state all over Europe, including Queen Victoria, for his perfumes and fragranced products.

With the headline "The Prince of Perfumers", The New York Times printed Rimmel's obituary on 15 March 1887. It stated that he was one of the founders of the French Hospital and Dispensary in London, and a constant advocate of its claims to the support of the public.

Rimmel married a woman from Seurre, eastern France, Elisabeth Letroublon with whom he had three children, Jules, Henry and Herminie. The sons assumed control of the beauty company at Rimmel's death in 1887, though they delegated the management of the company, which passed out of Rimmel family hands. After many difficulties Rimmel's cosmetics brand is now owned by Coty Inc.
