= Multilamellar emulsion =

Emulsion containing multiple lamellar lipid structures

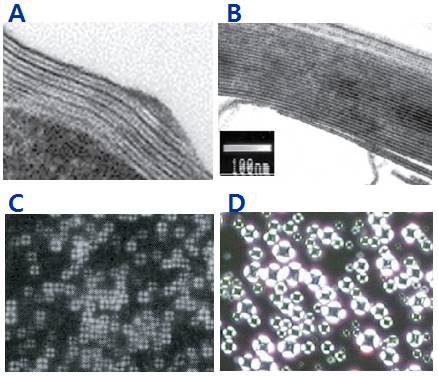
A. Lamellar structure of skin lipid ( * under electron microscopy ) B. Lamellar structure of MLE ( * under electron microscopy ) C. Maltese cross of skin lipid ( * under cross-polarized microscopy ) D. Maltese cross of MLE ( * cross-polarized microscopy )

A multilamellar emulsion (MLE) is an emulsion in which lipid or surfactant components are organized into multiple lamellar (layered) or liquid-crystalline structures. Such emulsions have been studied in colloid science, pharmaceutics, and cosmetics, particularly for topical formulations that mimic aspects of the lipid organization of the stratum corneum, the outermost layer of the skin. The term is used broadly for systems containing organized lipid layers, such as stacked lamellae or multilayered interfacial structures. Multilamellar emulsions based on artificial stratum-corneum lipids were described in 1993, and the company NeoPharm later commercialized a proprietary MLE technology.

== Structure and characterization ==
Lamellar phases form through the self-assembly of amphiphilic molecules into alternating hydrophilic and lipophilic layers. Lipid-based lyotropic liquid crystals can adopt lamellar, hexagonal, and other ordered phases depending on composition, hydration, and temperature. In emulsions, they may form multilayered interfaces, concentric lamellae, or vesicular assemblies. Unlike conventional oil-in-water emulsions, in which a single surfactant layer surrounds dispersed oil droplets, multilamellar emulsions contain ordered lipid multilayers whose architecture depends on lipid composition and ratios, surfactant selection, and processing conditions.

These structures are commonly characterized using polarized-light microscopy, transmission electron microscopy (TEM), X-ray diffraction, small-angle X-ray scattering (SAXS), differential scanning calorimetry (DSC), and Fourier-transform infrared spectroscopy, which provide complementary information on microstructure, phase behavior, and molecular organization. Polarized-light microscopy reveals the birefringence of anisotropic liquid-crystalline phases, which has also been observed in human stratum-corneum lipids dispersed in water. Such observations indicate optical anisotropy and organized lipid structures, but do not by themselves show that a formulation is molecularly equivalent to stratum-corneum lipids.

== Relationship to the skin barrier ==
The stratum corneum, the principal permeability barrier of the skin, consists of corneocytes embedded in an extracellular matrix composed mainly of ceramides, cholesterol, and free fatty acids. These lipids form a short-periodicity lamellar phase of about 6 nm and a long-periodicity phase of about 13 nm, the latter considered important for barrier function. Ceramide subclass, fatty-acid chain length, lipid ratios, and hydration all influence this organization and the resulting barrier properties. Multilamellar emulsions and other topical lipid formulations aim to reproduce some of these compositional or structural features, although they are not molecularly identical to native stratum-corneum lipids.

== History ==
In 1993, Suzuki and colleagues reported a multilamellar emulsion of artificial stratum-corneum lipids containing a synthetic pseudoceramide, a molecule designed to reproduce selected physicochemical properties of natural ceramides while offering advantages in stability and manufacturing. The study described the emulsion's formation mechanism and its effects on dry, scaly skin associated with impaired stratum-corneum function; this work predates NeoPharm's commercial MLE technology.

NeoPharm later developed and patented a proprietary MLE technology based on pseudoceramide-containing lipid systems. A 2003 study by Park and colleagues used small-angle X-ray diffraction, TEM, and DSC to characterize MLEs containing either a pseudoceramide or a type III synthetic ceramide. The pseudoceramide formulation showed lamellar repeat distances of about 11.5 and 7.61 nm, hexagonal lateral packing, and an orthorhombic phase at reduced water content, while the synthetic-ceramide formulation showed a 7.61 nm phase. TEM confirmed multilamellar structures, and the authors reported structural similarities to the intercellular lipids of human stratum corneum. The same year, an open crossover study compared a pseudoceramide-containing MLE with a commercial moisturizer in children with atopic dermatitis.

A 2019 study in the journal Cosmetics described Crystal Lamella MES, a lamellar formulation containing N-palmitoyl serinol. Cross-polarized microscopy and wide-angle X-ray scattering indicated concentric lamellae with hexagonal and orthorhombic lateral packing. In a small study of healthy volunteers, the formulation increased skin hydration relative to a gel-structured emulsion, with no significant change in transepidermal water loss.

== Applications ==
Multilamellar and related lipid formulations have been investigated for use in moisturizers, barrier-repair products, topical dermatological preparations, and delivery systems for lipophilic compounds. The rationale is that lipid composition and supramolecular organization may affect how a formulation interacts with the stratum corneum. Reviews of ceramide-containing formulations report improvements in skin hydration and barrier function in some settings, including atopic dermatitis, but call for larger and better-controlled studies.

== See also ==
- Lamellar phase
- Liquid crystal
- Ceramide
- Stratum corneum
- Skin barrier
- Emulsion
