= Liquid whistle =

Static mixer for fluids

A liquid whistle is a static mixer which passes fluid at high pressure through an orifice and over a blade. This subjects the fluid to high turbulence and may result in mixing or emulsification.
