= Macroemulsion =

Emulsion

Macroemulsions are dispersed liquid-liquid, thermodynamically unstable systems with particle sizes ranging from 1 to 100 μm (orders of magnitude), which, most often, do not form spontaneously. Macroemulsions scatter light effectively and therefore appear milky, because their droplets are greater than a wavelength of light. They are part of a larger family of emulsions along with miniemulsions (or nanoemulsions). As with all emulsions, one phase serves as the dispersing agent. It is often called the continuous or outer phase. The remaining phase(s) are disperse or inner phase(s), because the liquid droplets are finely distributed amongst the larger continuous phase droplets. This type of emulsion is thermodynamically unstable, but can be stabilized for a period of time with applications of kinetic energy. Surfactants (as the main emulsifiers) are used to reduce the interfacial tension between the two phases, and induce macroemulsion stability for a useful amount of time. Emulsions can be stabilized otherwise with polymers, solid particles (Pickering emulsions) or proteins.

IUPAC definition

Emulsion in which the particles of the dispersed phase have diameters from approximately 1 to 100 μm.

Note 1: Macro-emulsions comprise large droplets and thus are "unstable" in the sense that the droplets sediment or float, depending on the densities of the dispersed phase and dispersion medium. Separation of the dispersed and continuous phases usually occurs within time periods from a few seconds to a few hours, depending upon the viscosity of the fluid medium and the size and density of the droplets.

Note 2: Macro-emulsions usually contain low-molecular-weight or polymeric surfactants that decrease the rates of coalescence of dispersed droplets. Droplets of the dispersed phase may be also stabilized by adsorption of solid particles onto their surface (so-called Pickering stabilization).

== Classification ==
Macroemulsions can be divided into two main categories based on if they are a single emulsion or a double or multiple emulsion group. Both categories will be described using a typical oil (O) and water (W) immiscible fluid pairing. Single emulsions can be sub divided into two different types. For each single emulsion a single surfactant stabilizing layer exists as a buffer in between the two layers. In (O/W) oil droplets are dispersed in water. On the other hand, (W/O) involves water droplets finely dispersed in oil. Double or multiple emulsion classification is similar to single emulsion classification, except the immiscible phases are separated by at least two surfactant thin films. In a (W/O/W) combination, an immiscible oil phase exists between two separate water phases. In contrast, in an (O/W/O) combination the immiscible water phase separates two different oil phases.

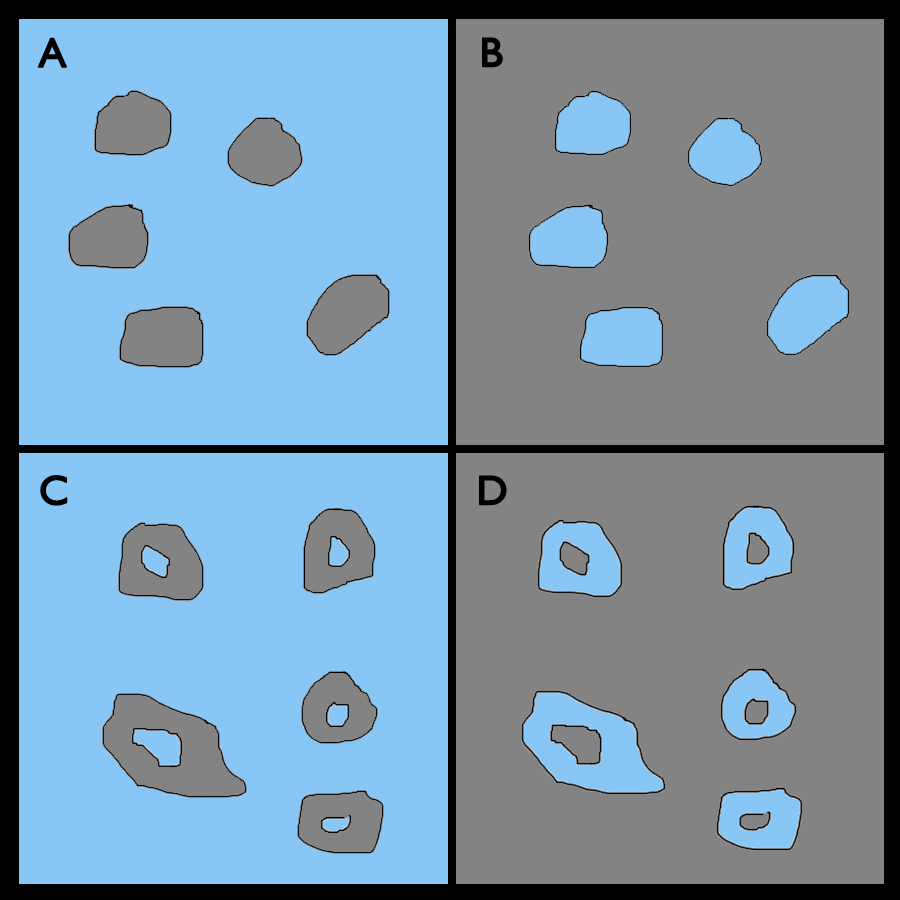
Image A is (O/W) emulsion. Image B is a (W/O) emulsion. Image C is a W/O/W multiple emulsion group. Image D is a (O/W/O) multiple emulsion group.

== Formation ==
Macroemulsions are formed in a variety of ways. Since they are not thermodynamically stable, they do not form spontaneously and require energy input, usually in the form of stirring or shaking of some kind to mechanically mix the otherwise immiscible phases. The resulting size of the macroemulsions typically depends on how much energy was used to mix the phases, with higher-energy mixing methods resulting in smaller emulsion particles. The energy required for this can be approximated using the following equation:

$\Delta G_{\rm em} = 3{\gamma V\over\ R_{\rm f}}$

Where $\Delta G_{\rm em}$ is the energy Input, $\gamma$ is the interfacial tension between the two phases, $V$ is the total volume of the mixture, and $R_{\rm f}$ is the average radius of the newly created emulsions

This equation gives the energy requirement just to separate the particles. In practice the energy cost is much higher, as most of the mechanical energy is simply converted to heat rather than mixing the phases.

There are other ways to create emulsions between two liquids, such as adding one phase with droplets already being the required size.

An emulsifying agent of some sort is also generally required. This helps form emulsions by reducing the interfacial tension between the two phases, usually by acting as a surfactant and adsorbing to the interface. This works because most emulsifiers have a hydrophilic and hydrophobic side, which means they can bond with both the oil-like phase and the water-like phase, thus reducing the number of water-oil molecular interactions at the surface. Reducing the number of these interactions reduces the interfacial energy, thus causing the emulsions to become more stable. The concentration of surfactant needed is much higher than its critical micelle concentration (CMC). This forms a surfactant monolayer which orients itself to minimize its surface to volume ratio. This ratio yields highly polydisperse spherical droplets in the range of 1 to 100 μm. The probability (P) of finding a certain sized droplet can be estimated for inner layer drops through the following equation:

$\ P = {{\ 1 \over\Delta R \sqrt{ 2 \pi\, } \ } \exp[{ \ ( \ln{R} \ - \ln{\bar{R}} \ )^2 \over\ 2 \Delta R^2 \ \ } \ }]$

where R is the radius of the droplet, $\bar{R} \$ is the mean radius, and $\Delta R \$ is the standard deviation.

Determining which phase is the continuous phase and which phase is the dispersed phase is done by using the Bancroft Rule when the two phases have similar mole fractions. This rule states that the phase which the emulsifier is the most soluble in will be the continuous phase, even if it has a smaller volume fraction overall. For example, a mixture that is 60% Water and 40% Oil can form an emulsion where the water is the dispersed phase and the oil is the continuous phase if the emulsifier is more soluble in the oil. This is because the continuous phase is the phase that can coalesce the fastest upon mixing, which means it is the phase that can diffuse the emulsifying agent away from its own interfaces and into the bulk the fastest. It seems that this rule is very well followed in the case of surfactant-stabilized emulsions, but not for Pickering emulsions. For mixtures with overwhelmingly large amounts of one phase, the largest phase will often become the continuous phase. However, highly concentrated emulsions (looking like 'liquid-liquid foams') can also be obtained and stabilized.

== Stability ==
Macroemulsions are, by definition, not thermodynamically stable. This means that from the moment they are created, they are always reverting to their original, immiscible and separate state. The reason why Macroemulsions can exist however, is because they are kinetically stable rather than thermodynamically stable. This means that, while they are continuously breaking down, it is done at such a slow pace that it is practically stable from a macroscopic perspective.

The reasons why macroemulsions are stable is similar to the reasons why colloids can be stable. Based on DLVO theory, repulsive forces from the charged surfaces of the two phases repel each other enough to offset the attractive forces of the Hamaker Force Interactions. This creates a potential energy well at some distance, where the particles are in a local area of stability despite not being directly touching and therefore coalescing. However, since this is an area of local rather than total low potential, if any set of particles can randomly have enough thermal energy they can coalesce into an even more stable state, which is why all macroemulsions gradually coalesce over time.

While it is energetically favorable for individual particles to coalesce due to the subsequent reduction of interfacial area, the adsorbed emulsifier prevents this. This is because it is more favorable for the emulsifying agent to be at an interface so reducing the interfacial area requires expending energy to return the emulsifying agent to the bulk.

Stability of the Macroemulsions are based on numerous environmental factors including temperature, pH, and the ionic strength of the solvent.

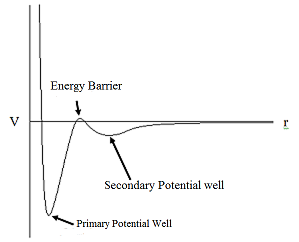

== Progression of macroemulsions ==
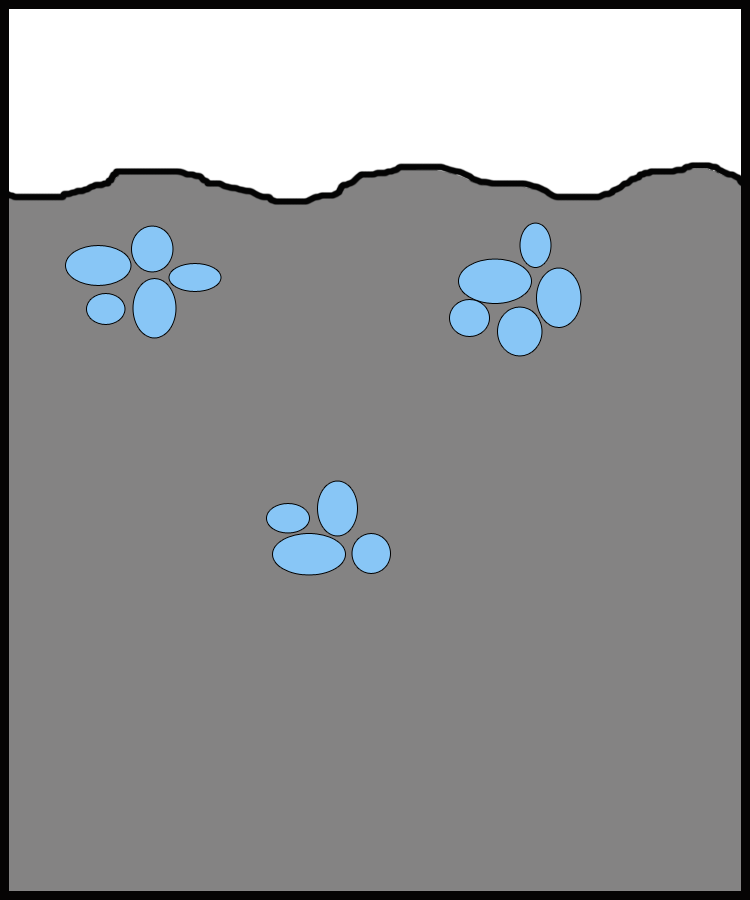
Flocculation is the accumulation of drops within a continuous liquid phase.

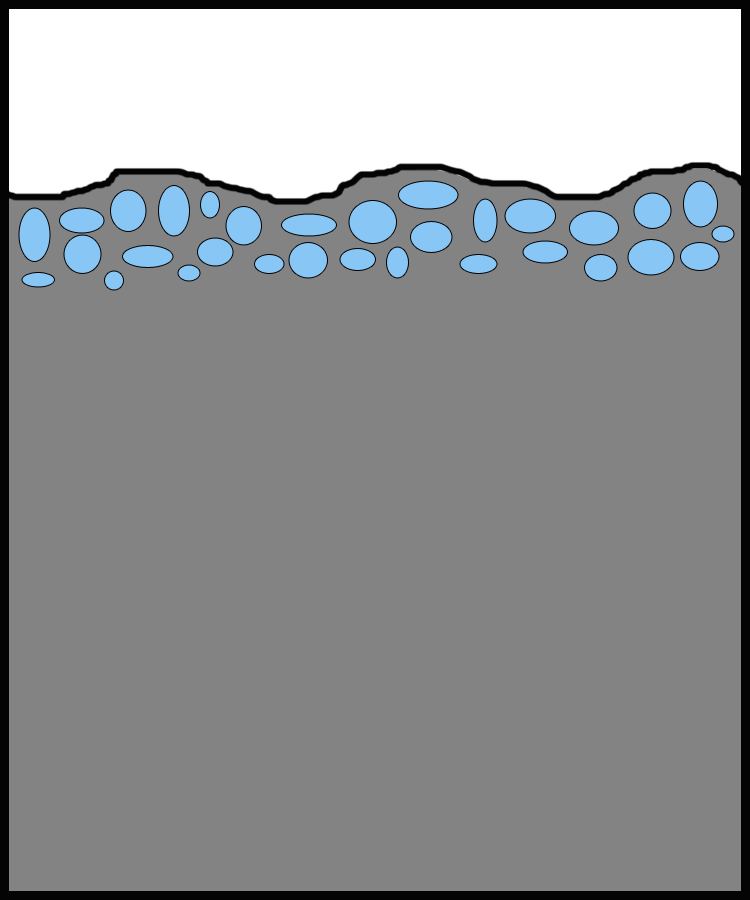
Creaming is the accumulation of drops at the top of a liquid continuous phase.

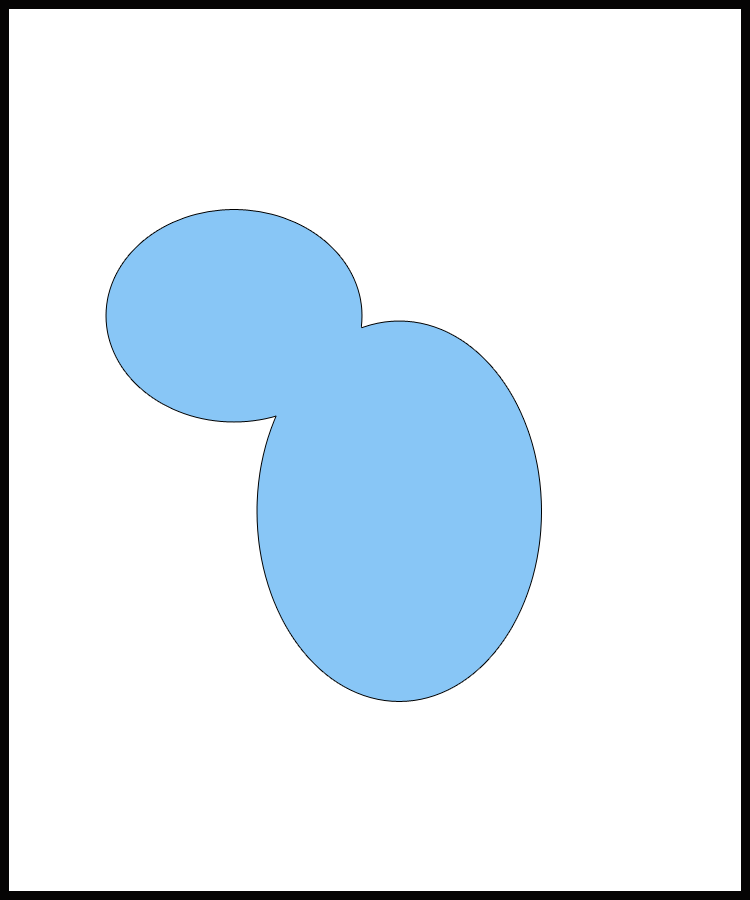
Coalescence is the merging of two drops into one single drop.

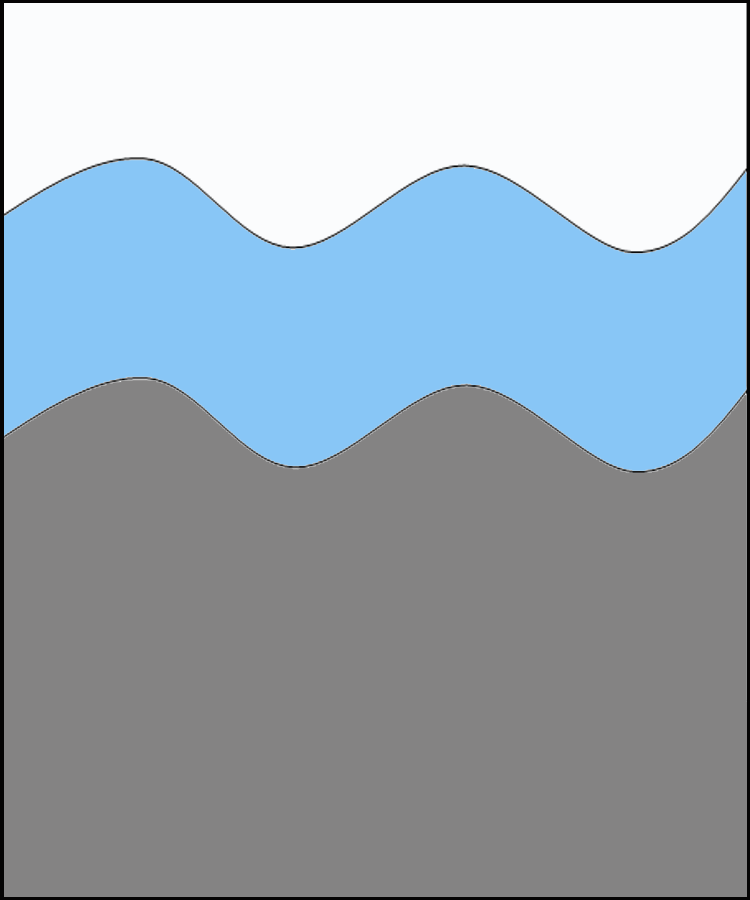
Demulsification is when the dispersed phase completely coalesces into one continuous phase.

=== Flocculation ===
Flocculation occurs when the dispersed drops group together throughout the continuous phase, but don't lose their individual identities. The driving force for flocculation is a weak van der Waals attraction between drops at large distances, which is known as the secondary energy minimum. An electrostatic repulsion between the surfaces prevents the drops from touching and merging, stabilizing the macroemulsion. The rate of diffusion limited encounters is equal to the upper limit for the decrease in droplet concentration and can be represented by the following equation:

$\frac{dc}{dt}=-8\pi\,DRc^2$

where D can be found using the Stokes-Einstein relation $D=\frac{k_B T}{6\pi\,\eta\,R}$, R is the droplet radius, and c is the number of droplets per unit volume. This equation can be reduced to the following:

$\frac{dc}{dt}=-k_fc^2$

where $k_f$ is the rate constant of flocculation $(k_f=\frac{4k_BT}{3\eta\,})$. If the droplet radii are not all the same size and aggregation occurs, the flocculation rate constant is equal to $\frac{8k_BT}{3\eta\,}$.

=== Creaming ===
Creaming is the accumulation of drops in the dispersed phase at the top of the container. This occurs as a result of buoyancy forces. The density of the dispersed and continuous phases, as well as the viscosity of the continuous phase, greatly affect the creaming process. If the dispersed phase liquid is less dense than the continuous phase liquid, creaming is more likely to occur. Also, there is a greater chance of creaming at lower viscosities of the continuous phase liquid. Once all of the dispersed drops are in close proximity to each other, it is easier for them to coalesce.

=== Coalescence ===
Coalescence is the merging of two dispersed drops into one. The surfaces of two drops must be in contact for coalescence to occur. This surface contact is dependent on both the van der Waals attraction and surface repulsion forces between two drops. Once in contact, the two surface films are able to fuse together, which is more likely to occur in areas where the surface film is weak. The liquid inside each drop is now in direct contact, and the two drops are able to merge into one.

=== Demulsification ===
Demulsification is the act of destabilizing an emulsion. Once all of the drops have coalesced, two continuous phases exist instead of one dispersed phase and one continuous phase. This process may be accelerated by adding a cosurfactant or salt or by slowly stirring the liquid solution. Demulsification is beneficial for several macroemulsion applications.

== Applications ==
Macroemulsions have nearly endless uses in scientific, industrial, and household applications. They are widely utilized today in automotive, beauty, cleaning and fabric care products as well as biotechnology and manufacturing techniques.

Macroemulsions are often chosen over microemulsions for automotive and industrial applications because they are less expensive, easier to dispose of, and their tendency to demulsify more quickly is often desirable for lubricants. Soluble oil lubricants, usually containing fatty oil or mineral oil in water, are ideal for high speed and low pressure applications. They are often used for friction reducing needs and metalworking.

Many skin care products, sun screens, and fabric softeners are made from silicone macroemulsions. Silicone's is chosen because of its non-irritating and lubricating properties. Different combinations of macroemulsions and surfactants are the subject of a wide range of biological research, especially in the area of cell cultures.

The following table outlines a few examples of macroemulsions and their applications:

Macroemulsion	Continuous Phase	Dispersed Phase	Application	Surfactant
Diesel Fuel and Water	Diesel	Water	Reducing fuel emissions	Nonionic surfactants based on aliphatic hydrocarbon tails (examples: alcohol ethoxylates, fatty acid ethoxylates, sugar esters of fatty acids)
Silicone and Water	Water	Silicone	Fabric Softener, Cosmetics	Nonionic surfactants (example: silicone copolyol)
Alcohol and Water	Water	Alcohol	Purifying contaminated ground water	Food or pharmaceutical quality agents similar to those used in whipped toppings and shampoos (examples: Polysorbate-20, Tween or Span)
Isooctane and Water	Isooctane	Water	Housing cell cultures	Have bactericide or bacteriostatic properties (example: Lecithin, a phospholipid found in many animals naturally)
