= Helene Winterstein-Kambersky =

Austrian singer and inventor (1900–1966)

- Born: 13 March 1900
- Died: 12 June 1966 (aged 66)
- Occupations: Singer and inventor

Helene Winterstein-Kambersky, née Vierthaler (13 March 1900 in Vienna – 12 June 1966 in the Hinterbrühl) was a singer and inventor of the world's first waterproof mascara.

Helene Winterstein-Kambersky came from an old family of musicians. She was the great-great-granddaughter of the Salzburg composer and founder of the Austrian elementary school system Michael Vierthaler, who studied music with Mozart's father Leopold and Joseph Haydn as well as being the patron of Franz Schubert, to whom he also dedicated an anthem.

== Singing career ==
Her singing career began in the early 1920s. She was a pupil of Lilli Lehmann, the opera singer and singing teacher from Salzburg. Due to her fine and dramaturgically highly developed interpretations of songs by composers such as Mozart, Franz Schubert, Wolf and Pfitzner, she has won numerous prizes in international singing competitions. In 1937 Winterstein-Kambersky was the first woman to sing in front of a darkened audience. Her stage name as a singer was Nussy.

== Cosmetics entrepreneur ==
In the 1920s, lead poisoning made her dependent on wheelchairs. Her experiences with stage makeup prompted her to invent the world's first waterproof mascara parallel to her singing career. She developed her recipe in around two thousand attempts, and proceeded to patent it. Her cosmetics company La Bella Nussy was founded in 1936 and became known far beyond the borders of Austria. In 2026, it is still family-owned in the third generation, still located in Vienna, and the mascara is still handmade using an almost unchanged recipe. The INCI ingredients of the current black colour variant are water, bleached beeswax, C11-12 isoparaffin, linseed oil, castor oil and the food colour iron oxide black (E 172). Therefore, unlike the vast majority of mascara commonly used today, it is not an ink but a cream. This means that it does not harden completely after application, which is why the eyelashes retain some of their flexibility. The product design is also partly based on the historical original, as tubes with spirals are still sold alongside today's modern, round brushes, to which they were the forerunners.

A special stamp in honour of Winterstein-Kambersky's inventive and entrepreneurial achievements has been issued by Austrian Post since 2013.
