= Rimmel =

British multinational cosmetics brand

Ella Marie Cohen Beauty Co. (Rimmel London)
- Type: Subsidiary
- Industry: Cosmetics
- Founded: 1834
- Founder: Eugène Rimmel
- Headquarters: London, England
- Area served: Worldwide
- Key people: Bernd Beetz (CEO)
- Products: cosmetics
- Parent: Coty
- Website: rimmellondon.com

Rimmel (commonly known as Rimmel London) is a British multinational cosmetics brand, now owned by parent company Coty. The House of Rimmel was founded by French-born British cosmetics entrepreneur Eugène Rimmel in 1834, in Bond Street, London.

With creative success, Rimmel London began creating products such as pomades and mouth rinses. Today, the brand is one of the world's most popular make-up producers.

== Marketing and spokesmodels ==
Rimmel's company motto is "Get the London Look". The faces of Rimmel were Kate Moss, Sophie Ellis-Bextor, Lily Cole, Ayumi Hamasaki, and ITV's Holly Willoughby.

In October 2009, it was announced that Jerry Hall, Georgia May Jagger, and Canadian supermodel, Coco Rocha, were set to join to the line up of spokeswomen. Within days of Rocha's first campaign release, Rimmel announced that they had signed Zooey Deschanel, Solange Knowles, and Alejandra Ramos Munoz to help the brand launch into the global marketplace. In 2013, Rimmel announced their collaboration with British singer, Rita Ora, for makeup collections. In 2016, Rimmel named Cara Delevingne as one of the faces of the brand.

Ads featuring Moss and Jagger were banned from British magazines and television after the Advertising Standards Authority found them to be misleading as the ads used false lashes. In 2021, Rimmel announced Adwoa Aboah as the global activist for the brand and the face of major beauty campaigns for the year. In 2022, Tom Daley became the first male ambassador of the brand. In 2023, Maya Jama became the global ambassador for the brand.

=== International ===
Rimmel products are available in pharmacies and supermarkets in Argentina, Australia, Austria, Bahrain, Belarus, Belgium, Bulgaria, Canada, China, Croatia, Czech Republic, Denmark, Estonia, Finland, France, Germany, Hong Kong, Hungary, India, Indonesia, Ireland, Israel, Italy, Japan, Latvia, Lithuania, Lebanon, Malta, Mexico, Netherlands, Norway, Poland, Portugal, Qatar, Romania, Russia, Saudi Arabia, Slovakia, South Africa, South Korea, Spain, Turkey, Lebanon, United Arab Emirates, United Kingdom, Ukraine, Greece, and United States.
