= Ceteareth =

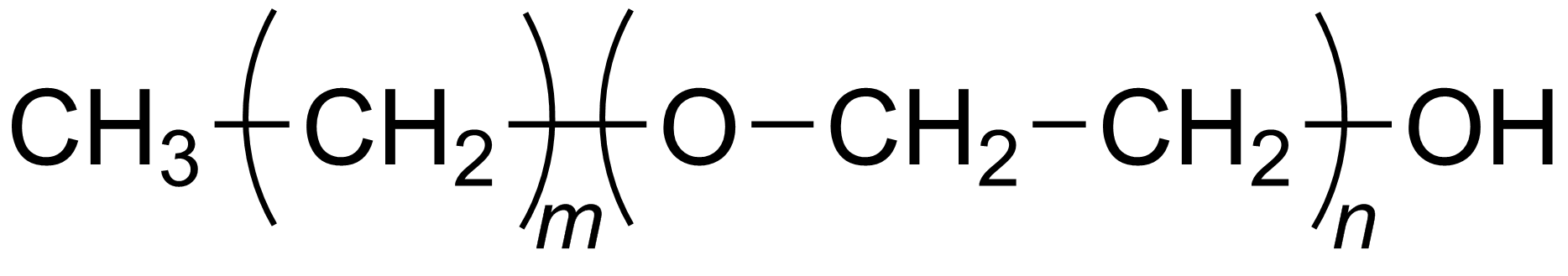
Chemical structure of ceteareth-n, where n is variable from 2 to 100 and m is 15 or 17

The INCI names ceteareth-n (where n is a number) refer to polyoxyethylene ethers of a mixture of high molecular mass saturated fatty alcohols, mainly cetyl alcohol (m = 15) and stearyl alcohol (m = 17). The number n indicates the average number of ethylene oxide residues in the polyoxyethylene chain.

These compounds are non-ionic surfactants that work by attracting both water and oil at the same time, frequently used as emulsifiers in soaps and cosmetics.

== List of ceteareth compounds ==
- Ceteareth-2
- Ceteareth-3
- Ceteareth-4
- Ceteareth-5
- Ceteareth-6
- Ceteareth-7
- Ceteareth-8
- Ceteareth-9
- Ceteareth-10
- Ceteareth-11
- Ceteareth-12
- Ceteareth-13
- Ceteareth-15
- Ceteareth-16
- Ceteareth-17
- Ceteareth-18
- Ceteareth-20 (CAS # 68439-49-6)
- Ceteareth-22
- Ceteareth-23
- Ceteareth-25
- Ceteareth-27
- Ceteareth-28
- Ceteareth-29
- Ceteareth-30
- Ceteareth-33
- Ceteareth-34
- Ceteareth-40
- Ceteareth-50
- Ceteareth-55
- Ceteareth-60
- Ceteareth-80
- Ceteareth-100
