= Meat emulsion =

Meat emulsion is a two-phase system, with the dispersed phase consisting of either solid or liquid fat particles and the continuous phase being the water containing salts and dissolved, gelled and suspended proteins. Thus, they can be classified as oil-in-water emulsion. Meat emulsion is not a true emulsion since the two phases involved are not liquids and the fat droplets in a commercial emulsion are larger than 50 μm in diameter and thus do not conform to one of the requirements of a classical emulsion. Common examples of meat emulsions include bologna, frankfurters, sausages, and meatloaf.

The continuous phase mainly consists of water, water-soluble proteins and salt-soluble proteins. The dispersed phase or discontinuous phase consists of fat droplets.

The water-soluble proteins are sarcoplasmic proteins such as myoglobin and other pigments; salt-soluble proteins are myofibrillar proteins such as myosin, actin, and actinins.

== Meat emulsifiers ==
When used in food products, iota carrageenan and sodium stearoyl lactylate have a synergistic effect allowing for stabilizing/emulsifying that is not obtained with any other type of carrageenan (kappa/lambda) or with other emulsifiers (monoglycerides, etc.). Sodium stearoyl lactylate combined with iota carrageenan is capable of producing emulsions under both hot and cold conditions using either vegetable or animal fat.
