= Water-in-water emulsion =

Water-in-water (W/W) emulsion is a system that consists of droplets of water-solvated molecules in another continuous aqueous solution; both the droplet and continuous phases contain different molecules that are entirely water-soluble. As such, when two entirely aqueous solutions containing different water-soluble molecules are mixed, water droplets containing predominantly one component are dispersed in water solution containing another component. Recently, such a water-in-water emulsion was demonstrated to exist and be stable from coalescence by the separation of different types of non-amphiphilic, but water-soluble molecular interactions. These molecular interactions include hydrogen bonding, pi stacking, and salt bridging. This w/w emulsion was generated when the different water-solvated molecular functional groups get segregated in an aqueous mixture consisting of polymer and liquid crystal molecules.

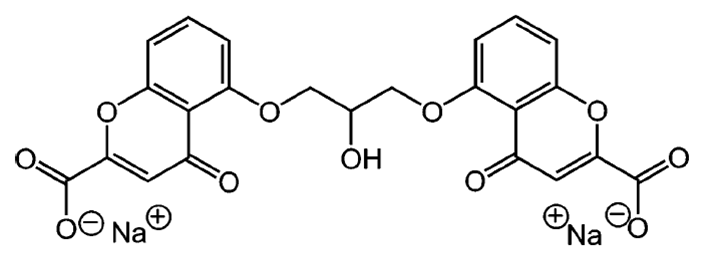
Structure of disodium cromolyn glycate, DSCG

This water-in-water emulsion consists of liquid crystals suspended as water-solvated droplets dispersed in a solution of polymer whose solvent is also water. The liquid crystal component of the emulsion is disodium cromolyn glycate (DSCG). This molecule is an anti-asthmatic drug, but also exists as a special type of liquid crystal when the concentration of DSCG is ~9-21 wt%. Unlike conventional lyotropic liquid crystals which consist of oily molecules such as 5CB, DSCG molecules are not amphiphilic, but entirely water-soluble. Thus, the separation of hydrophobic/hydrophilic groups cannot be applied to DSCG. The polymer solution serves as the medium or continuous phase of the w/w emulsion. Apart from being water-soluble, one important criterion for the generation of this w/w emulsion system is that the polymer cannot bear functional groups that interact strongly with DSCG. As such, ionic polymer when mixed with DSCG does not form w/w emulsion, but gives rise to a homogeneous solution or a precipitate solution. Consequently, the known polymers that afford w/w emulsion include polyacrylic amides and polyols. Surprisingly, some of these water-in-water emulsions can be exceptionally stable from coalescence for up to 30 days. Because molecules of liquid crystal assume a preferred common orientation among themselves, the overall orientation of liquid crystals in a droplet is only stable in certain configurations (Fig. 3). As water solvated droplets in a w/w emulsion, DSCG molecules would align in a preferred direction on the surface of the droplet. To minimize the overall energy of the system, the DSCG molecules in the droplet prefer to align either parallel or perpendicular to the surfaces of the droplets.(Fig. 4A, B).

The stability of this water-in-water emulsion from coalescence is attributed to three molecular forces:

1. The separation of different molecular forces at the beginning of the droplet formation. Similar forces tend to stay together: pi-stacking and salt bridging are the two dominant forces in the liquid crystal droplet phase, while hydrogen bonding governs in the continuous polymer phase.

2. As the droplet size increases, the molecular interactions at the interface of the droplet phase and the continuous phase become stronger through multivalent interactions. The strengthening of interfacial molecular interactions in w/w emulsions results in the formation of a layer of polymer that coats the surface of the droplet which consequently prevents droplets from clumping together.

3. In addition, it is also proposed that when two liquid crystal droplets merge (coalescence), the orientation of the liquid crystal molecules in the two merging droplets must change to “adapt” to each other, and thus incur an energy penalty which prevent the occurrence of coalescence.

This w/w emulsion also represents a new class of polymer dispersed liquid crystals(PDLC). Traditionally known PDLC consists of oil-in-water emulsion where the oily droplet is a thermotropic liquid crystal such as 4-pentyl-4'-cyanobiphenyl (5CB), and the water phase contains certain polymers. In comparison, this water-in-water emulsion consists of Polymer-Dispersed Lyotropic Liquid Crystals, where the lyotropic liquid crystal is DSCG molecules solvated in water. Traditional PDLCs have found application, from switchable windows to projection displays. The water-in-water emulsion of polymer-dispersed lyotropic liquid crystals has the potential for building highly bio-functional materials because of its compatibility with protein structure.

Other known types of water-in-water emulsions involve the separation of different biopolymers in aqueous solution.
