= Microemulsion =

Thermodynamically stable, isotropic mixture of oil, water, and surfactant

Microemulsions are clear, thermodynamically stable, isotropic liquid mixtures of oil, water and surfactant, frequently in combination with a cosurfactant. The aqueous phase may contain salt(s) and/or other ingredients, and the "oil" may actually be a complex mixture of different hydrocarbons. In contrast to ordinary emulsions, microemulsions form upon simple mixing of the components and do not require the high shear conditions generally used in the formation of ordinary emulsions. The three basic types of microemulsions are direct (oil dispersed in water, o/w), reversed (water dispersed in oil, w/o) and bicontinuous.

In ternary systems such as microemulsions, where two immiscible phases (water and ‘oil’) are present with a surfactant, the surfactant molecules may form a monolayer at the interface between the oil and water, with the hydrophobic tails of the surfactant molecules dissolved in the oil phase and the hydrophilic head groups in the aqueous phase.

== Uses ==
IUPAC definition

Micro-emulsion: Dispersion made of water, oil, and surfactant(s) that is an isotropic and thermodynamically stable system with dispersed domain diameter varying approximately from 1 to 100 nm, usually 10 to 50 nm.

Note 1: In a micro-emulsion the domains of the dispersed phase are either globular or interconnected (to give a bicontinuous micro-emulsion).

Note 2: The average diameter of droplets in macro-emulsion (usually referred to as an“emulsion”) is close to one millimeter (i.e., 10^{−3} m). Therefore, since micro- means 10^{−6}and emulsion implies that droplets of the dispersed phase have diameters close to 10^{−3} m, the micro-emulsion denotes a system with the size range of the dispersed phase in the 10^{−6} × 10^{−3} m = 10^{−9} m range.

Note 3: The term “micro-emulsion” has come to take on special meaning. Entities of the dispersed phase are usually stabilized by surfactant and/or surfactant-cosurfactant (e.g., aliphatic alcohol) systems.

Note 4: The term “oil” refers to any water-insoluble liquid.

Micro-emulsion polymerization: Emulsion polymerization in which the starting system is a micro-emulsion and the final latex comprises colloidal particles of polymer dispersed in an aqueous medium.

Note: Diameters of polymer particles formed in the micro-emulsion polymerization usually are between 10 and 50 nm.

Microemulsions have many commercially important uses:

- Water-in-oil microemulsions for some dry cleaning processes
- Floor polishers and cleaners
- Personal care products
- Pesticide formulations
- Cutting oils
- Drugs

Much of the work done on these systems have been motivated by their possible use to mobilize petroleum trapped in porous sandstone for enhanced oil recovery. A fundamental reason for the uses of these systems is that a microemulsion phase sometimes has an ultralow interfacial tension with a separate oil or aqueous phase, which may release or mobilize them from solid phases even in conditions of slow flow or low pressure gradients.

Microemulsions also have industrial applications, one of them being the synthesis of polymers. Microemulsion polymerization is a complex heterogeneous process where transport of monomers, free radicals and other species (such as chain transfer agent, co-surfactant and inhibitors) between the aqueous and organic phases, takes place. Compared with other heterogeneous polymerization processes (suspension or emulsion) microemulsion polymerization is a more complicated system. Polymerization rate is controlled by monomer partitioning between the phases, particle nucleation, and adsorption and desorption of radicals. Particle stability is affected by the amount and type of surfactant and pH of dispersing medium. It is also used in the process of creating nanoparticles.

The kinetics of microemulsion polymerization has much in common with emulsion polymerization kinetics, the most characteristic feature of which is the compartmentalization, where the radicals growing inside the particles are separated from each other, thus suppressing termination to a high extent and, as a consequence, providing high rates of polymerization.

== Theory ==
Various theories concerning microemulsion formation, stability and phase behavior have been proposed over the years. For example, one explanation for their thermodynamic stability is that the oil/water dispersion is stabilized by the surfactant present and their formation involves the elastic properties of the surfactant film at the oil/water interface, which involves as parameters, the curvature and the rigidity of the film. These parameters may have an assumed or measured pressure and/or temperature dependence (and/or the salinity of the aqueous phase), which may be used to infer the region of stability of the microemulsion, or to delineate the region where three coexisting phases occur, for example. Calculations of the interfacial tension of the microemulsion with a coexisting oil or aqueous phase are also often of special focus and may sometimes be used to guide their formulation.

== History and terminology ==
The term microemulsion was first used by T. P. Hoar and J. H. Shulman, professors of chemistry at Cambridge University, in 1943. Alternative names for these systems are often used, such as transparent emulsion, swollen micelle, micellar solution, and solubilized oil. More confusingly still, the term microemulsion can refer to the single isotropic phase that is a mixture of oil, water and surfactant, or to one that is in equilibrium with coexisting predominantly oil and/or aqueous phases, or even to other non-isotropic phases. As in the binary systems (water/surfactant or oil/surfactant), self-assembled structures of different types can be formed, ranging, for example, from (inverted) spherical and cylindrical micelles to lamellar phases and bicontinuous microemulsions, which may coexist with predominantly oil or aqueous phases.

== Phase diagrams ==
Microemulsion domains are usually characterized by constructing ternary-phase diagrams. Three components are the basic requirement to form a microemulsion: two immiscible liquids and a surfactant. The majority of microemulsions use oil and water as immiscible liquid pairs. If a cosurfactant is used, it may sometimes be represented at a fixed ratio to surfactant as a single component, and treated as a single "pseudo-component". The relative amounts of these three components can be represented in a ternary phase diagram. Gibbs phase diagrams can be used to show the influence of changes in the volume fractions of the different phases on the phase behavior of the system.

The three components composing the system are each found at an apex of the triangle, where their corresponding volume fraction is 100%. Moving away from that corner reduces the volume fraction of that specific component and increases the volume fraction of one or both of the two other components. Each point within the triangle represents a possible composition of a mixture of the three components or pseudo-components, which may consist (ideally, according to the Gibbs' phase rule) of one, two or three phases. These points combine to form regions with boundaries between them, which represent the "phase behavior" of the system at constant temperature and pressure.

The Gibbs phase diagram, however, is an empirical visual observation of the state of the system and may, or may not express the true number of phases within a given composition. Apparently clear single phase formulations can still consist of multiple iso-tropic phases (e.g. the apparently clear heptane/AOT/water microemulsions consist multiple phases). Since these systems can be in equilibrium with other phases, many systems, especially those with high volume fractions of both the two immiscible phases, can be easily destabilised by anything that changes this equilibrium e.g. high or low temperature or addition of surface tension modifying agents.

However, examples of relatively stable microemulsions can be found. It is believed that the mechanism for removing acid build up in car engine oils involves low water phase volume, water-in-oil (w/o) microemulsions. Theoretically, transport of the aqueous acid droplets through the engine oil to microdispersed calcium carbonate particles in the oil should be most efficient when the aqueous droplets are small enough to transport a single hydrogen ion (the smaller the droplets, the greater the number of acid water droplets, the faster the neutralisation). Such microemulsions are probably very stable across a reasonably wide range of elevated temperatures.

== Bibliography ==
- Prince, Leon M., Microemulsions in Theory and Practice Academic Press (1977) ISBN 0-12-565750-1.
- Rosano, Henri L and Clausse, Marc, eds., Microemulsion Systems (Surfactant Science Series) Marcel Dekker, Inc. (1987) ISBN 0-8247-7439-6
