= Emulsion =

Mixture of two or more immiscible liquids

1. Two immiscible liquids (I and II), not yet emulsified; 2. An emulsion of phase II dispersed in phase I; 3. The unstable emulsion progressively separates; 4. The surfactant (outline around particles) positions itself on the interfaces between Phase II and Phase I, stabilizing the emulsion

An emulsion is a mixture of two or more liquids that are normally immiscible (unmixable or unblendable) owing to liquid-liquid phase separation. Emulsions are part of a more general class of two-phase systems of matter called colloids. Although the terms colloid and emulsion are sometimes used interchangeably, emulsion more narrowly refers to when both phases, dispersed and continuous, are liquids. In an emulsion, one liquid (the dispersed phase) is dispersed in the other (the continuous phase). Examples of emulsions include vinaigrettes, homogenized milk, liquid biomolecular condensates, and some cutting fluids for metal working.

Two liquids can form different types of emulsions. As an example, oil and water can form, first, an oil-in-water emulsion, in which the oil is the dispersed phase, and water is the continuous phase. Second, they can form a water-in-oil emulsion, in which water is the dispersed phase and oil is the continuous phase. Multiple emulsions are also possible, including a "water-in-oil-in-water" emulsion and an "oil-in-water-in-oil" emulsion.

Emulsions, being liquids, do not exhibit a static internal structure. The droplets dispersed in the continuous phase (sometimes referred to as the "dispersion medium") are usually assumed to be statistically distributed to produce roughly spherical droplets.

The term "emulsion" is also used to refer to the photo-sensitive side of photographic film. Such a photographic emulsion consists of silver halide colloidal particles dispersed in a gelatin matrix. Nuclear emulsions are similar to photographic emulsions, except that they are used in particle physics to detect high-energy elementary particles.

Whilst an emulsion roughly corresponds to a mixture of at least two immiscible liquids mixed together, by contrast emulsification is the process of dispersing two or more immiscible liquids together through the use of an emulsifier (e.g., lecithin in a mixture of oil and water). Nanoemulsification is the process of emulsification in the nanoscale. A nanoemulsion is a particular kind of emulsion, with droplet sizes on the order of 100 nm.

IUPAC

A fluid system in which liquid droplets are dispersed in a liquid.

Note 1: The definition is based on the definition in ref.

Note 2: The droplets may be amorphous, liquid-crystalline, or any
mixture thereof.

Note 3: The diameters of the droplets constituting the dispersed phase
usually range from approximately 10 nm to 100 μm; i.e., the droplets
may exceed the usual size limits for colloidal particles.

Note 4: An emulsion is termed an oil/water (o/w) emulsion if the
dispersed phase is an organic material and the continuous phase is
water or an aqueous solution and is termed water/oil (w/o) if the dispersed
phase is water or an aqueous solution and the continuous phase is an
organic liquid (an "oil").

Note 5: A w/o emulsion is sometimes called an inverse emulsion.
The term "inverse emulsion" is misleading, suggesting incorrectly that
the emulsion has properties that are the opposite of those of an emulsion.
Its use is, therefore, not recommended.

== Etymology ==
The word emulsion comes from the Latin emulgere 'to milk out', from ex 'out' + mulgere 'to milk', as milk is an emulsion of fat and water, along with other components, including colloidal casein micelles (a type of secreted biomolecular condensate).

== Appearance and properties ==
Emulsions contain both a dispersed and a continuous phase, with the boundary between the phases called the "interface". Emulsions tend to have a cloudy appearance because the many phase interfaces scatter light as it passes through the emulsion. Emulsions appear white when all light is scattered equally. If the emulsion is dilute enough, higher-frequency (shorter-wavelength) light will be scattered more, and the emulsion will appear bluer – this is called the "Tyndall effect". If the emulsion is concentrated enough, the color will be distorted toward comparatively longer wavelengths, and will appear more yellow. This phenomenon is easily observable when comparing skimmed milk, which contains little fat, to cream, which contains a much higher concentration of milk fat.

Two special classes of emulsions – microemulsions and nanoemulsions, with droplet sizes below 100 nm – appear translucent. This property is due to the fact that light waves are scattered by the droplets only if their sizes exceed about one-quarter of the wavelength of the incident light. Since the visible spectrum of light is composed of wavelengths between 390 and 750 nanometers (nm), if the droplet sizes in the emulsion are below about 100 nm, the light can penetrate through the emulsion without being scattered. Due to their similarity in appearance, translucent nanoemulsions and microemulsions are frequently confused. Unlike translucent nanoemulsions, which require specialized equipment to be produced, microemulsions are spontaneously formed by "solubilizing" oil molecules with a mixture of surfactants, co-surfactants, and co-solvents. The required surfactant concentration in a microemulsion is, however, several times higher than that in a translucent nanoemulsion, and significantly exceeds the concentration of the dispersed phase. Because of many undesirable side-effects caused by surfactants, their presence is disadvantageous or prohibitive in many applications. In addition, the stability of a microemulsion is often easily compromised by dilution, by heating, or by changing pH levels.

Common emulsions are inherently unstable and, thus, do not tend to form spontaneously. Energy input – through shaking, stirring, homogenizing, or exposure to powerful ultrasound – is needed to form an emulsion. Over time, emulsions tend to revert to the stable state of the phases comprising the emulsion. An example of this is seen in the separation of the oil and vinegar components of vinaigrette, an unstable emulsion that will quickly separate unless shaken almost continuously. There are important exceptions to this rule – microemulsions are thermodynamically stable, while translucent nanoemulsions are kinetically stable.

Whether an emulsion of oil and water turns into a "water-in-oil" emulsion or an "oil-in-water" emulsion depends on the volume fraction of both phases and the type of emulsifier (surfactant) (see Emulsifier, below) present.

=== Instability ===
Emulsion stability refers to the ability of an emulsion to resist change in its properties over time. There are four types of instability in emulsions: flocculation, coalescence, creaming/sedimentation, and Ostwald ripening. Flocculation occurs when there is an attractive force between the droplets, so they form flocs, like bunches of grapes. This process can be desired, if controlled in its extent, to tune physical properties of emulsions such as their flow behaviour. Coalescence occurs when droplets bump into each other and combine to form a larger droplet, so the average droplet size increases over time. Emulsions can also undergo creaming, where the droplets rise to the top of the emulsion under the influence of buoyancy, or under the influence of the centripetal force induced when a centrifuge is used. Creaming is a common phenomenon in dairy and non-dairy beverages (i.e. milk, coffee milk, almond milk, soy milk) and usually does not change the droplet size. Sedimentation is the opposite phenomenon of creaming and normally observed in water-in-oil emulsions. Sedimentation happens when the dispersed phase is denser than the continuous phase and the gravitational forces pull the denser globules towards the bottom of the emulsion. Similar to creaming, sedimentation follows Stokes' law.

An appropriate surface active agent (or surfactant) can increase the kinetic stability of an emulsion so that the size of the droplets does not change significantly with time. The stability of an emulsion, like a suspension, can be studied in terms of zeta potential, which indicates the repulsion between droplets or particles. If the size and dispersion of droplets does not change over time, it is said to be stable. For example, oil-in-water emulsions containing mono- and diglycerides and milk protein as surfactant showed that stable oil droplet size over 28 days storage at 25 °C.

=== Monitoring physical stability ===
The stability of emulsions can be characterized using techniques such as light scattering, focused beam reflectance measurement, centrifugation, and rheology. Each method has advantages and disadvantages.

=== Accelerating methods for shelf life prediction ===
The kinetic process of destabilization can be rather long – up to several months, or even years for some products. Often the formulator must accelerate this process in order to test products in a reasonable time during product design. Thermal methods are the most commonly used – these consist of increasing the emulsion temperature to accelerate destabilization (if below critical temperatures for phase inversion or chemical degradation). Temperature affects not only the viscosity but also the interfacial tension in the case of non-ionic surfactants or, on a broader scope, interactions between droplets within the system. Storing an emulsion at high temperatures enables the simulation of realistic conditions for a product (e.g., a tube of sunscreen emulsion in a car in the summer heat), but also accelerates destabilization processes up to 200 times.

Mechanical methods of acceleration, including vibration, centrifugation, and agitation, can also be used.

These methods are almost always empirical, without a sound scientific basis.

== Emulsifiers ==
An emulsifier is a substance that stabilizes an emulsion by reducing the oil-water interface tension. Emulsifiers are a part of a broader group of compounds known as surfactants, or "surface-active agents". Surfactants are compounds that are typically amphiphilic, meaning they have a polar or hydrophilic (water-soluble) part and a non-polar (hydrophobic or lipophilic) part. Emulsifiers that are more soluble in water (and, conversely, less soluble in oil) will generally form oil-in-water emulsions, while emulsifiers that are more soluble in oil will form water-in-oil emulsions.

The following are examples of food emulsifiers:

- Egg yolk – in which the main emulsifying and thickening agent is lecithin.
- Mustard – where a variety of chemicals in the mucilage surrounding the seed hull act as emulsifiers
- Soy lecithin is another emulsifier and thickener
- Pickering stabilization – uses particles under certain circumstances
- Mono- and diglycerides – a common emulsifier found in many food products (coffee creamers, ice creams, spreads, breads, cakes)
- Sodium stearoyl lactylate
- DATEM (diacetyl tartaric acid esters of mono- and diglycerides) – an emulsifier used primarily in baking
- Proteins – those with both hydrophilic and hydrophobic regions, e.g. sodium caseinate.
  - Processed cheese uses acids such as phosphates to chelate away calcium, which allows cheese casein to work as an emulsifier. The phosphate is considered an emulsifying agent; the actual emulsifier is the casein already present in cheese.
- Applesauce – sometimes used in baking as an alternative to egg yolk or fats to make up for dietary restrictions such as allergies or being vegan

In food emulsions, the type of emulsifier greatly affects how emulsions are structured in the stomach and how accessible the oil is for gastric lipases, thereby influencing how fast emulsions are digested and trigger a satiety inducing hormone response.

Detergents are another class of surfactant, and will interact physically with both oil and water, thus stabilizing the interface between the oil and water droplets in suspension. This principle is exploited in soap, to remove grease for the purpose of cleaning. Many different emulsifiers are used in pharmacy to prepare emulsions such as creams and lotions. Common examples include emulsifying wax, polysorbate 20, and ceteareth 20.

Sometimes the inner phase itself can act as an emulsifier, and the result is a nanoemulsion, where the inner state disperses into "nano-size" droplets within the outer phase. A well-known example of this phenomenon, the "ouzo effect", happens when water is poured into a strong alcoholic anise-based beverage, such as ouzo, pastis, absinthe, arak, or raki. The anisolic compounds, which are soluble in ethanol, then form nano-size droplets and emulsify within the water. The resulting color of the drink is opaque and milky white.

== Mechanisms of emulsification ==
A number of different chemical and physical processes and mechanisms can be involved in the process of emulsification:

- Surface tension theory – according to this theory, emulsification takes place by reduction of interfacial tension between two phases
- Repulsion theory – According to this theory, the emulsifier creates a film over one phase that forms globules, which repel each other. This repulsive force causes them to remain suspended in the dispersion medium
- Viscosity modification – emulgents like acacia and tragacanth, which are hydrocolloids, as well as PEG (polyethylene glycol), glycerine, and other polymers like CMC (carboxymethyl cellulose), all increase the viscosity of the medium, which helps create and maintain the suspension of globules of dispersed phase

== Uses ==
=== In food ===
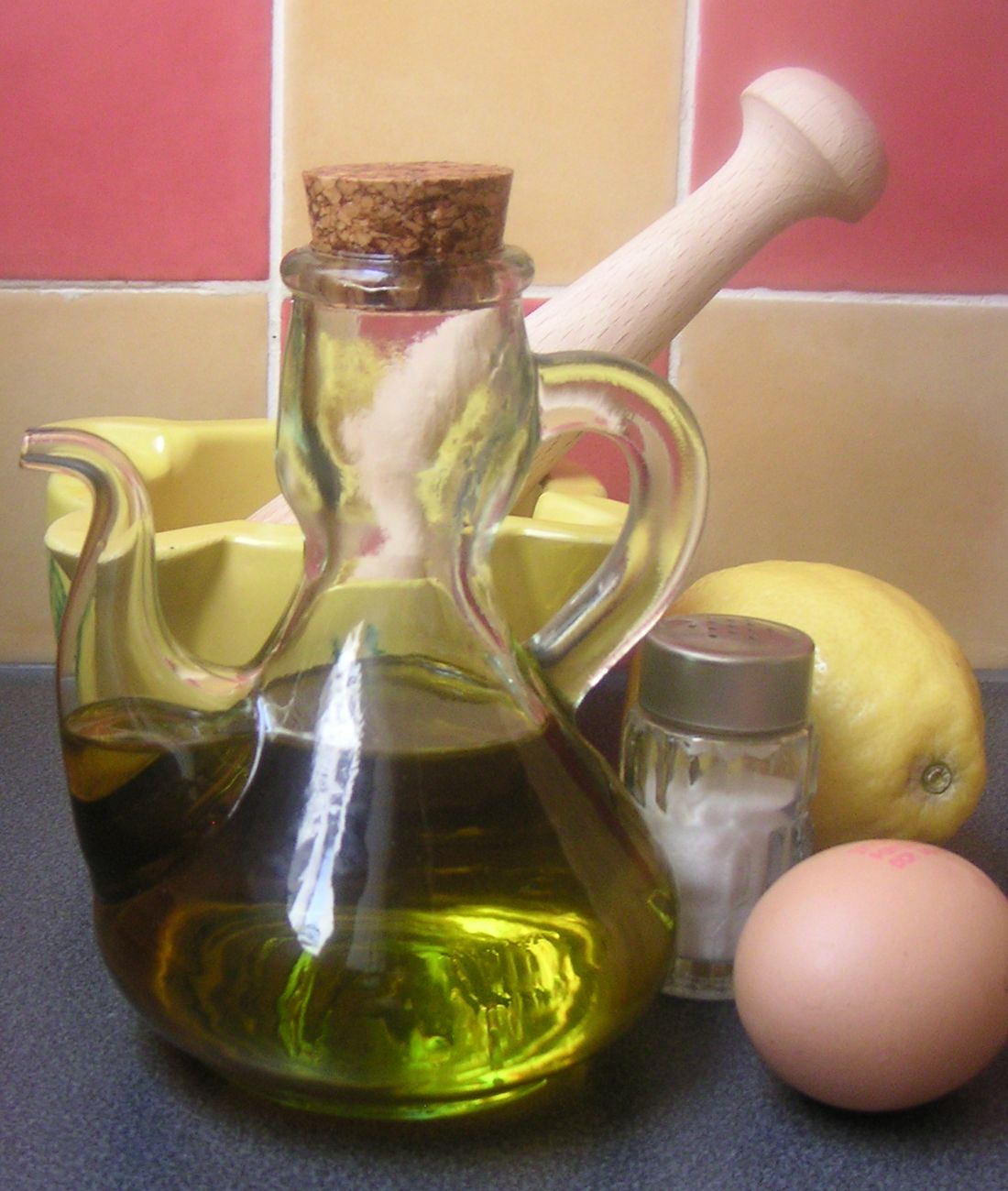
An example of the ingredients used to make mayonnaise; olive oil, table salt, an egg (for yolk) and a lemon (for lemon juice). The oil and water in the egg yolk do not mix, while the lecithin in the yolk serves as an emulsifier, allowing the two to be blended together.

Oil-in-water emulsions are common in food products:

- Mayonnaise and Hollandaise sauces – these are oil-in-water emulsions stabilized with egg yolk lecithin, or with other types of food additives, such as sodium stearoyl lactylate
- Homogenized milk – an emulsion of milk fat in water, with milk proteins as the emulsifier
- Vinaigrette – an emulsion of vegetable oil in vinegar, if this is prepared using only oil and vinegar (i.e., without an emulsifier), an unstable emulsion results

Water-in-oil emulsions are less common in food, but still exist:

- Butter – an emulsion of water in butterfat
- Margarine

Other foods can be turned into products similar to emulsions, for example meat emulsion is a suspension of meat in liquid that is similar to true emulsions.

=== In health care ===
In pharmaceutics, hairstyling, personal hygiene, and cosmetics, emulsions are frequently used. These are usually oil and water emulsions but dispersed, and which is continuous depends in many cases on the pharmaceutical formulation. These emulsions may be called creams, ointments, liniments (balms), pastes, films, or liquids, depending mostly on their oil-to-water ratios, other additives, and their intended route of administration. The first five are topical dosage forms, and may be used on the surface of the skin, transdermally, ophthalmically, rectally, or vaginally. A highly liquid emulsion may also be used orally, or may be injected in some cases.

Microemulsions are used to deliver vaccines and kill microbes. Typical emulsions used in these techniques are nanoemulsions of soybean oil, with particles that are 400–600 nm in diameter. The process is not chemical, as with other types of antimicrobial treatments, but mechanical. The smaller the droplet the greater the surface tension and thus the greater the force required to merge with other lipids. The oil is emulsified with detergents using a high-shear mixer to stabilize the emulsion so that when emulsion nano-droplets encounter the lipids in the cell membrane or cell envelope of bacteria or viruses, they force those lipids to merge with the nano-droplets. On a mass scale, this effectively disintegrates the membrane and kills the pathogen. The soybean oil emulsion does not harm normal human cells, or the cells of most other higher organisms, with the exceptions of sperm cells and blood cells, which are vulnerable to nanoemulsions due to the peculiarities of their membrane structures. For this reason, these nanoemulsions are not used intravenously (IV). The most effective application of this type of nanoemulsion is for the disinfecting of surfaces. Some types of nanoemulsion have been shown to effectively destroy HIV-1 and tuberculosis pathogens on non-porous surfaces.

==== Applications in pharmaceutical industry ====
- Oral drug delivery: Emulsions may provide an efficient means of administering drugs that are poorly soluble or have low bioavailability or dissolution rates, increasing both dissolution rates and absorption to increase bioavailability and improve bioavailability. By increasing surface area provided by an emulsion, dissolution rates and absorption rates of drugs are increased, improving their bioavailability.
- Topical formulations: Emulsions are widely utilized as bases for topical drug delivery formulations such as creams, lotions and ointments. Their incorporation allows lipophilic as well as hydrophilic drugs to be mixed together for maximum skin penetration and permeation of active ingredients.
- Parenteral drug delivery: Emulsions serve as carriers for intravenous or intramuscular administration of drugs, solubilizing lipophilic ones while protecting from degradation and decreasing injection site irritation. Examples include propofol as a widely used anesthetic and lipid-based solutions used for total parenteral nutrition delivery.
- Ocular Drug Delivery: Emulsions can be used to formulate eye drops and other ocular drug delivery systems, increasing drug retention time in the eye and permeating through corneal barriers more easily while providing sustained release of active ingredients and thus increasing therapeutic efficacy.
- Nasal and Pulmonary Drug Delivery: Emulsions can be an ideal vehicle for creating nasal sprays and inhalable drug products, enhancing drug absorption through nasal and pulmonary mucosa while providing sustained release with reduced local irritation.
- Vaccine Adjuvants: Emulsions can serve as vaccine adjuvants by strengthening immune responses against specific antigens. Emulsions can enhance antigen solubility and uptake by immune cells while simultaneously providing controlled release, amplifying an immunological response and thus amplifying its effect.
- Taste Masking: Emulsions can be used to encase bitter or otherwise unpleasant-tasting drugs, masking their taste and increasing patient compliance - particularly with pediatric formulations.
- Cosmeceuticals: Emulsions are widely utilized in cosmeceuticals products that combine cosmetic and pharmaceutical properties. These emulsions act as carriers for active ingredients like vitamins, antioxidants and skin lightening agents to provide improved skin penetration and increased stability.

=== In firefighting ===
Emulsifying agents are effective at extinguishing fires on small, thin-layer spills of flammable liquids (class B fires). Such agents encapsulate the fuel in a fuel-water emulsion, thereby trapping the flammable vapors in the water phase. This emulsion is achieved by applying an aqueous surfactant solution to the fuel through a high-pressure nozzle. Emulsifiers are not effective at extinguishing large fires involving bulk/deep liquid fuels, because the amount of emulsifier agent needed for extinguishment is a function of the volume of the fuel, whereas other agents such as aqueous film-forming foam need cover only the surface of the fuel to achieve vapor mitigation.

=== Chemical synthesis ===
Emulsions are used to manufacture polymer dispersions – polymer production in an emulsion 'phase' has a number of process advantages, including prevention of coagulation of product. Products produced by such polymerisations may be used as the emulsions – products including primary components for glues and paints. Synthetic latexes (rubbers) are also produced by this process.

== See also ==
- Emulsion dispersion – Thermoplastics or elastomers suspended in a liquid state by means of emulsifiers
- Emulsified fuel – Emulsions composed of water and a combustible liquid
- Homogenizer – Equipment used for the homogenization of various types of material
- Liquid whistle – Static mixer for fluids
- Miniemulsion – Particular type of emulsion
- Multilamellar emulsion – Emulsion containing multiple lamellar lipid structures
- Pickering emulsion – Type of emulsion
- Rheology – Study of the flow of matter, primarily in a fluid state
- Water-in-water emulsion

== General and cited references ==
- Sherman, Philip (1963). Rheology of Emulsions: Proceedings of a symposium held by the British Society of Rheology ... Harrogate, October 1962. British Society of Rheology / Macmillan. ISBN 9780080102900.
- Nalwa, H. S., ed. (2000). Handbook of Nanostructured Materials and Nanotechnology. Vol. 5. New York: Academic Press. pp. 501–575.
