= Diffusion (disambiguation) =

Diffusion is a time-dependent random process causing a spread in space.

Diffusion may also refer to:

== Physical sciences ==
- Molecular diffusion, spontaneous dispersion of mass (distinct from migration, caused by an external force)
- Conduction of heat
- Momentum diffusion
- Diffusion equation
  - Heat equation
  - Schrödinger equation
- Eddy diffusion

=== More specific meanings ===
- Anomalous diffusion, the movement of particles from a region of lower concentration to a region of higher concentration
- Diffusion MRI
- Diffusion (acoustics), sound waves
- Atomic diffusion
- Brownian motion
- Collective diffusion
- Facilitated diffusion
- Effusion of a gas through small holes
- Gaseous diffusion
- Itō diffusion
- Knudsen diffusion of particles from very small containers
- Osmosis, the movement of molecules through a membrane
- Reverse osmosis, a process to separate unwanted particles from a fluid
- Photon diffusion, an optical effect
  - Diffuse reflection, the reflection of light from an uneven or granular surface
- Reverse diffusion, the movement of particles from a region of lower concentration to a region of higher concentration
- Rotational diffusion
- Self-diffusion
- Surface diffusion
- Thermodiffusion

== Social sciences ==
- Demic diffusion of a population to a new area (uninhabited or already inhabited by others)
- Cultural diffusion of culture ideas and items within a single culture or from one to another
  - Diffusion of innovations between cultures or societies, or within one
  - Lexical diffusion of sound changes across a language

== Technology ==
- Diffusion (cryptography), the spreading of influence of bits in a cipher
- Error diffusion in image processing
- Diffusion model in machine learning media or text generation.

== Other uses ==
- Diffusion (business), the process by which a new idea or new product is accepted by the market
- Diffusion line, a secondary line of merchandise created by a high-end fashion designer
- Diffusion Pharmaceuticals, a drug development company
- Diffusion process, in probability theory the solution to a stochastic differential equation
- Diffusion of responsibility
- Society for the Diffusion of Useful Knowledge
- Diffusion Science Radio Show, a science radio show and podcast on 2SER in Sydney
- Diffusion Records, an independent record label
- Sound diffusion, a performance practice in electronic music

== See also ==
- Diffuser (disambiguation)
- Diffuse nebula
- Migration (disambiguation)
