= Grain boundary diffusion coefficient =

Diffusion coefficient of a diffusant along a grain boundary

The grain boundary diffusion coefficient is the diffusion coefficient of a diffusant along a grain boundary in a polycrystalline solid. It is a physical constant denoted $D_b$, and it is important in understanding how grain boundaries affect atomic diffusivity. Grain boundary diffusion is a commonly observed route for solute migration in polycrystalline materials. It dominates the effective diffusion rate at lower temperatures in metals and metal alloys. Take the apparent self-diffusion coefficient for single-crystal and polycrystal silver, for example. At high temperatures, the coefficient $D_b$ is the same in both types of samples. However, at temperatures below 700 °C, the values of $D_b$ with polycrystal silver consistently lie above the values of $D_b$ with a single crystal.

== Measurement ==
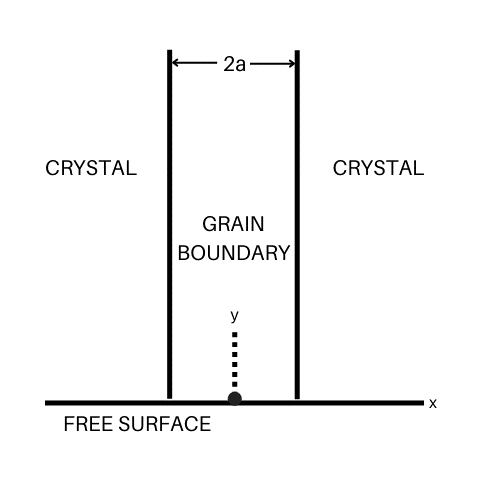
A model of grain boundary diffusion developed by JC Fisher in 1953. This solution can then be modeled via a modified differential solution to Fick's Second Law that adds a term for sideflow out of the boundary, given by the equation$a\frac{\partial \varphi}{\partial t}+f(y,t)=aD'{\partial^2 \varphi\over\partial x^2}$, where $D'$ is the diffusion coefficient, $2a$ is the boundary width, and $f(y,t)$ is the rate of sideflow.

The general way to measure grain boundary diffusion coefficients was suggested by Fisher. In the Fisher model, a grain boundary is represented as a thin layer of high-diffusivity uniform and isotropic slab embedded in a low-diffusivity isotropic crystal. Suppose that the thickness of the slab is $\delta$, the length is $y$, and the depth is a unit length, the diffusion process can be described as the following formula. The first equation represents diffusion in the volume, while the second shows diffusion along the grain boundary, respectively.

$\frac{\partial c}{\partial t}=D\left({\partial^2 c\over\partial x^2}+{\partial^2 c\over\partial y^2}\right)$ where $|x|>\delta/2$

$\frac{\partial c_b}{\partial t}=D_b\left({\partial^2 c_b\over\partial y^2}\right)+\frac{2D}{\delta}\left(\frac{\partial c}{\partial x}\right)_{x=\delta/2}$

where $c(x, y, t)$ is the volume concentration of the diffusing atoms and $c_b(y, t)$ is their concentration in the grain boundary.

To solve the equation, Whipple introduced an exact analytical solution. He assumed a constant surface composition, and used a Fourier–Laplace transform to obtain a solution in integral form. The diffusion profile therefore can be depicted by the following equation.

$(dln\bar{c}/dy^{6/5})^{5/3}=0.66(D_1/t)^{1/2}(1/D_b\delta)$

To further determine $D_b$, two common methods were used. The first is used for accurate determination of $D_b \delta$. The second technique is useful for comparing the relative $D_b \delta$ of different boundaries.

- Method 1: Suppose the slab was cut into a series of thin slices parallel to the sample surface, we measure the distribution of in-diffused solute in the slices, $c(y)$. Then we used the above formula that developed by Whipple to get $D_b \delta$.
- Method 2: To compare the length of penetration of a given concentration at the boundary $\ \Delta y$ with the length of lattice penetration from the surface far from the boundary.

== See also ==
- Kirkendall effect
- Phase transformations in solids
- Mass diffusivity
