= Effective diffusion coefficient =

Diffusion coefficient through the pore space of a porous media

The effective diffusion coefficient of a diffusant (atoms of a material which are diffusing in another material) in atomic diffusion of solid polycrystalline materials like metal alloys is often represented as a weighted average of the grain boundary diffusion coefficient and the lattice diffusion coefficient. Diffusion along both the grain boundary and in the lattice may be modeled with an Arrhenius equation. The ratio of the grain boundary diffusion activation energy over the lattice diffusion activation energy is usually 0.4–0.6, so as temperature is lowered, the grain boundary diffusion component increases. Increasing temperature often allows for increased grain size, and the lattice diffusion component increases with increasing temperature, so often at 0.8 T_{melt} (of an alloy), the grain boundary component can be neglected.

== Modeling ==
The effective diffusion coefficient can be modeled using Hart's equation when lattice diffusion is dominant (type A kinetics):

$$D_\text{eff} = f D_\text{gb} + (1-f) D_\ell$$

where

$D_\text{eff} = {}$effective diffusion coefficient
$D_\text{gb} = {}$grain boundary diffusion coefficient
$D_\ell = {}$lattice diffusion coefficient
$$f = \frac{q \delta}{d}$$
$q = {}$value based on grain shape, 1 for parallel grains, 3 for square grains
$d = {}$average grain size
$\delta = {}$grain boundary width, often assumed to be 0.5 nm

Grain boundary diffusion is significant in face-centered cubic metals below about 0.8 T_{melt} (Absolute). Line dislocations and other crystalline defects can become significant below ~0.4 T_{melt} in FCC metals.

== See also ==
- Kirkendall effect
- Mass diffusivity
