= Intake =

Opening or structure through which a fluid is admitted into a space or machine

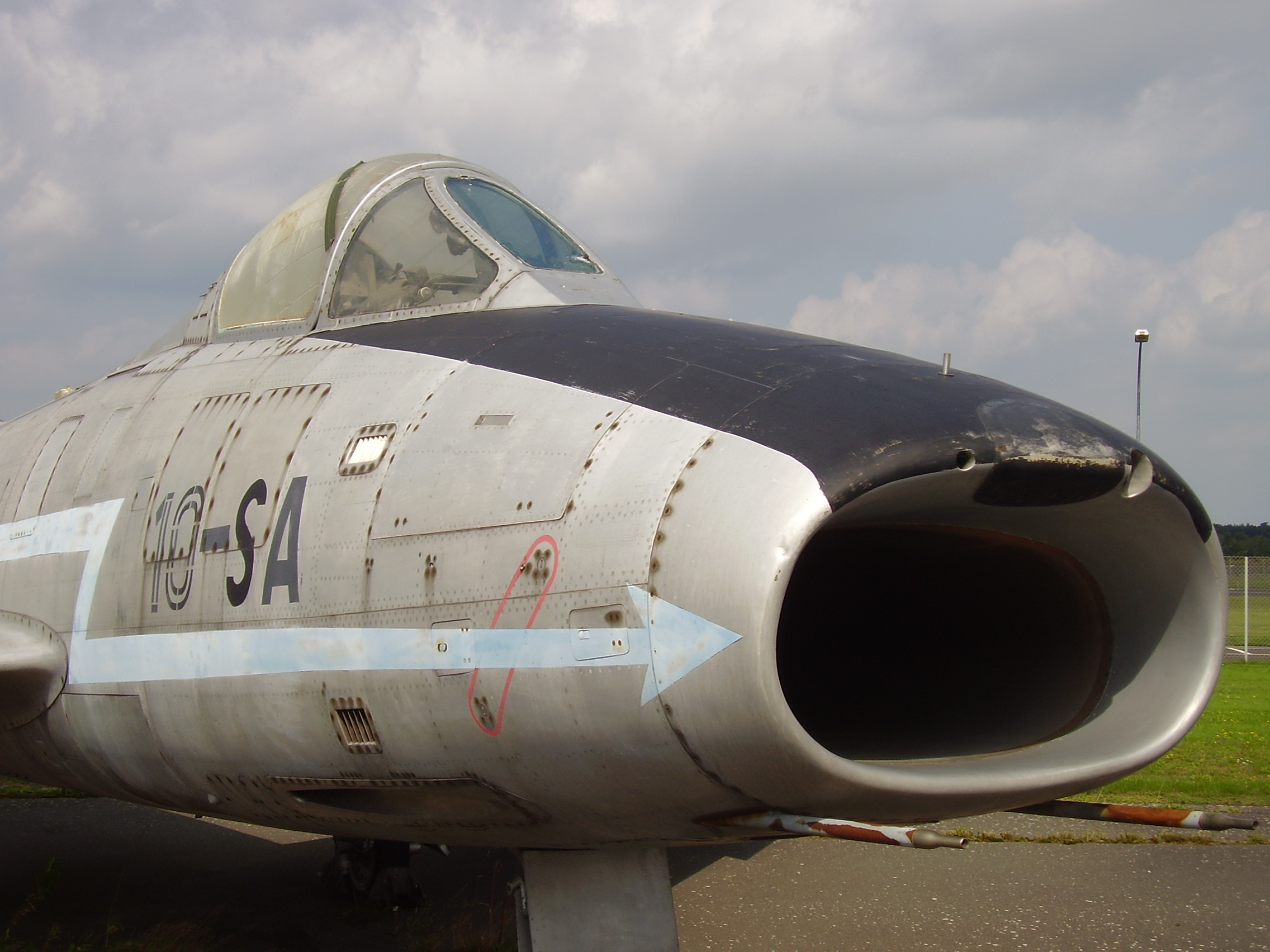
Dassault Super Mystère showing entry to engine intake duct

An intake (also inlet) is an opening, structure or system through which a fluid is admitted to a space or machine as a consequence of a pressure differential between the outside and the inside. The pressure difference may be generated on the inside by a mechanism, or on the outside by ram pressure or hydrostatic pressure. Flow rate through the intake depends on pressure difference, fluid properties, and intake geometry.

Intake refers to an opening, or area, together with its defining edge profile which has an associated entry loss, that captures pipe flow from a reservoir or storage tank. Intake refers to the capture area definition and attached ducting to an aircraft gas turbine engine or ramjet engine and, as such, an intake is followed by a compressor or combustion chamber. It may instead be referred to as a diffuser. For an automobile engine the components through which the air flows to the engine cylinders, are collectively known as an intake system and may include the inlet port and valve. An intake for a hydroelectric power plant is the capture area in a reservoir which feeds a pressure pipe, or penstock, or into an open canal.

== Hydroelectric systems and dams ==
The intake or inlet is a structure that controls water flow, or an enclosed pipe that delivers water to hydro turbines and sewerage systems.

== Automobile engine intakes ==
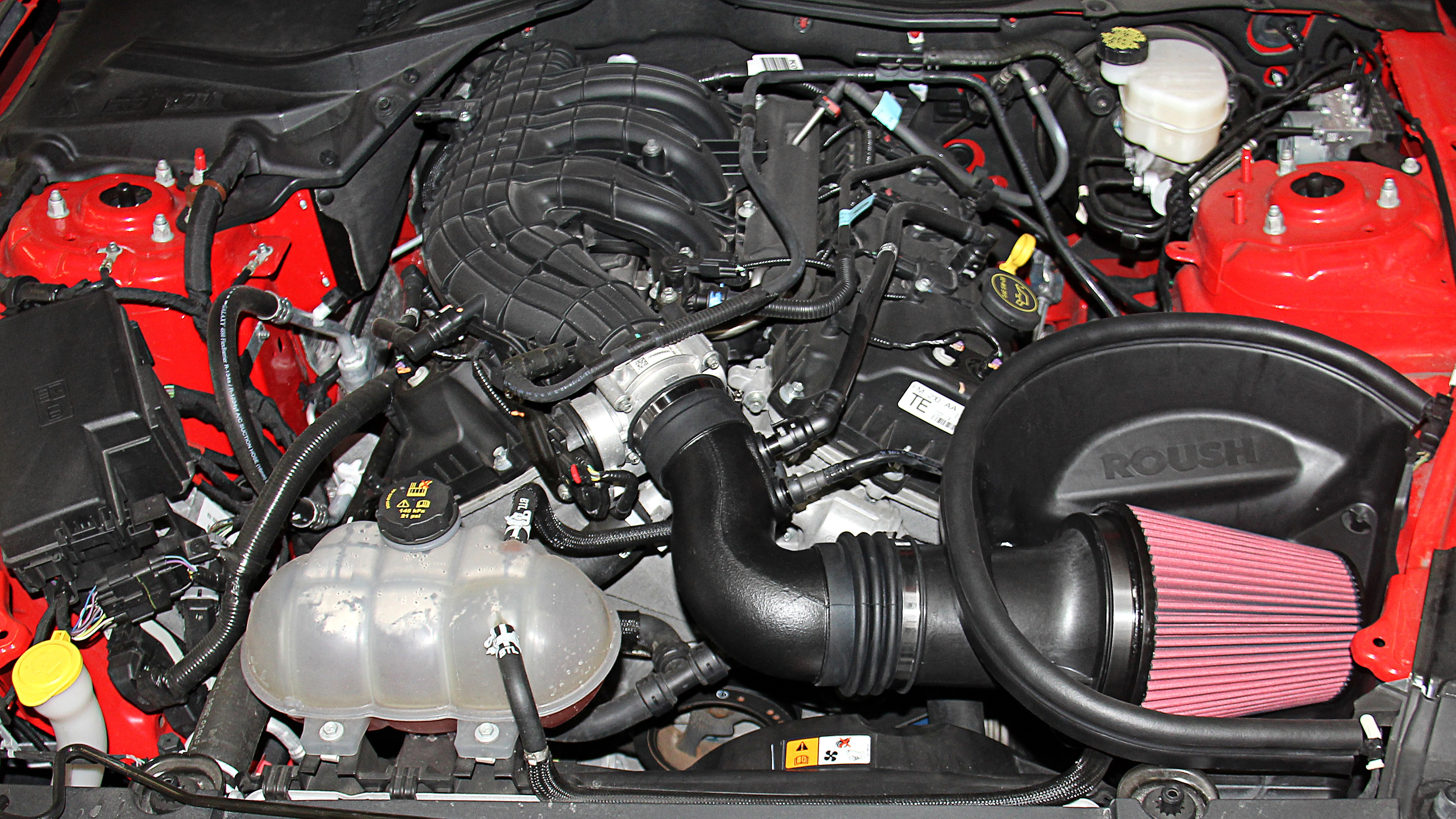
Intake assembly of a Ford Mustang showing pink air filter, plastic ducting with sensors, metal throttle body and plastic manifold with plenum and runners

Early automobile intake systems were simple air inlets connected directly to carburetors. The first air filter was implemented on the 1915 Packard Twin Six.

The modern automobile air intake system has three main parts, an air filter, mass flow sensor, and throttle body. Some modern intake systems can be highly complex, and often include specially designed intake manifolds to optimally distribute air and air/fuel mixture to each cylinder. Many cars today now include a silencer to minimize the noise entering the cabin. Silencers impede airflow and create turbulence which reduce total power, so performance enthusiasts often remove them.

All the above is usually accomplished by flow testing on a flow bench in the port design stage. Cars with turbochargers or superchargers which provide pressurized air to the engine usually have highly refined intake systems to improve performance dramatically.

Production cars have specific-length air intakes to cause the air to resonate at a specific frequency to assist airflow into the combustion chamber. Aftermarket companies for cars have introduced larger throttle bodies and air filters to decrease restriction of flow at the cost of changing the harmonics of the air intake for a small net increase in power or torque.

== Aircraft intakes ==
Aircraft using piston engines use intake systems similar to automobiles.

With the development of jet engines and the subsequent ability of aircraft to travel at supersonic speeds, it was necessary to design inlets to provide the flow required by the engine over a wide operating envelope and to provide air with a high-pressure recovery and low distortion. These designs became more complex as aircraft speeds increased to Mach 3.0 and Mach 3.2, design points for the XB-70 and SR-71 respectively. The inlet is part of the fuselage or part of the nacelle.

Aircraft with a maximum speed greater than about Mach 2 use intakes with variable geometry to achieve good pressure recovery from take-off to maximum speed.

== Blow-in doors ==
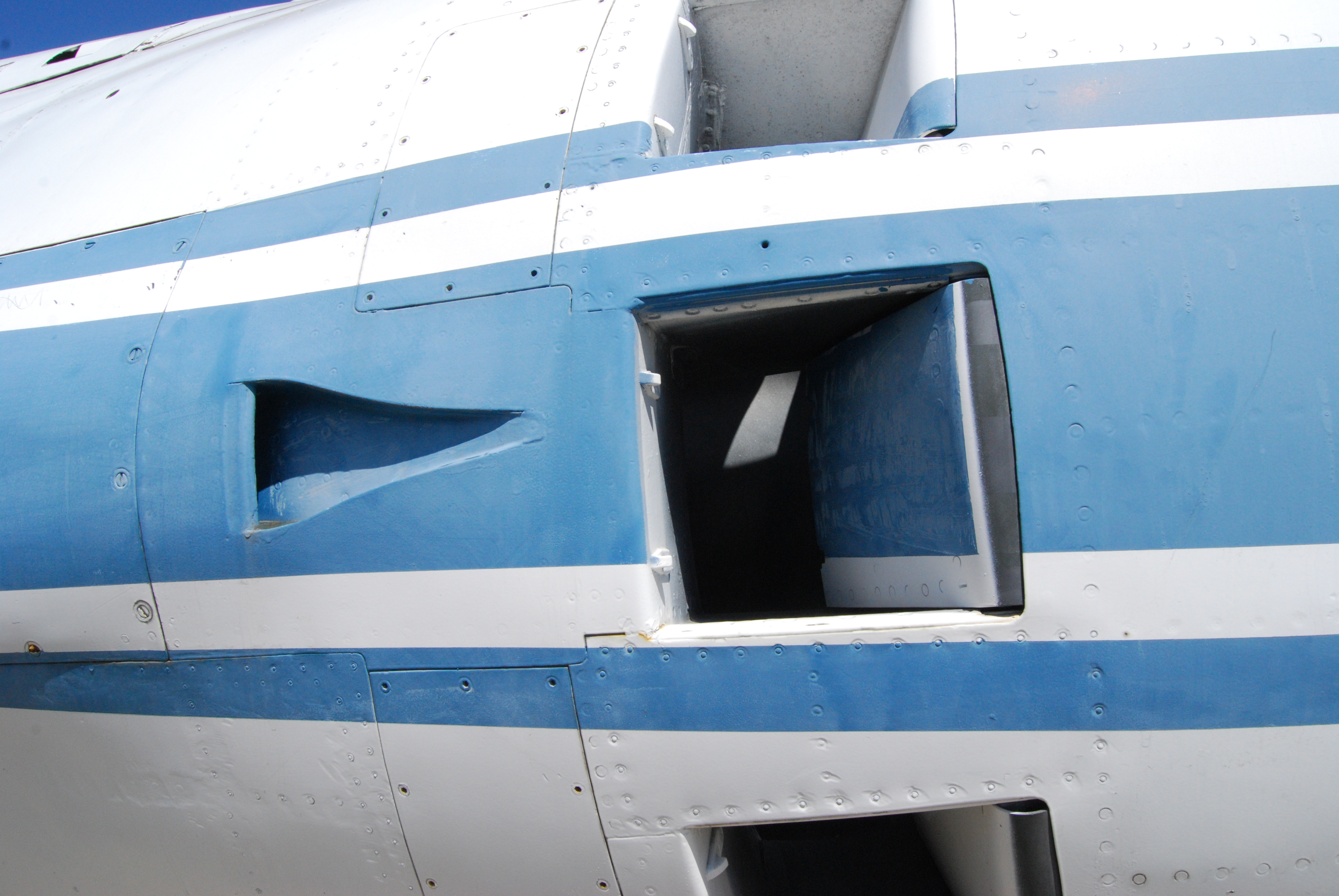
Blow-in door

Blow-in doors (or suck-in doors) are spring-loaded panels on early jet engine air intakes (like on Boeing 707s, early 737s, and Harriers) that open at low speeds and high thrust (takeoff/landing) to provide extra airflow, preventing engine stalls and reducing intake noise, a compromise not found on modern engines as designs evolved. They function by negative pressure, essentially "blowing" air in when the engine demands more than available airspeed can provide, then closing as speed increases.

== See also ==
- Cold air intake
- Warm air intake
- Short ram air intake
- S-duct
- NACA duct
- Ram-air intake
- Intake ramp
- Inlet manifold
