= Constrictivity =

Parameter for diffusion and fluid flow in porous media

Constrictivity is a dimensionless parameter used to describe transport processes (often molecular diffusion) in porous media.

Constrictivity is viewed to depend on the ratio of the diameter of the diffusing particle to the pore diameter. The value of constrictivity is always less than 1. The constrictivity is defined not for a single pore, but as the parameter of the entire pore space considered.

The resistance to transport in porous media increases because the viscosity of the fluid (which fills the pores) increases in the vicinity of the pore walls (Renkin effect; see also electroviscous effects). This effect is important in very narrow pores and in pores narrowing their diameter to the same size as the diameter of the diffusing particles. Constrictivity must be distinguished from the effects of Knudsen diffusion. Knudsen diffusion occurs when the particle interacts with the pore walls more than it does with other particles due to the large free path and narrow pores. Constrictivity, on the other hand, depends on the influence of the pore walls on the fluid filling the pores.

There are a number of empirical formulas used to estimate the value of constrictivity. For simple pore geometries, constrictivity can be inferred from the geometry of the porous media. In practice, the constrictivity together with the porosity and tortuosity are often used in models as purely empirical parameters to establish the effective diffusivities in porous media.

== Sources ==
- P. Grathwohl: Diffusion in natural porous media: Contaminant transport, sorption/desorption and dissolution kinetics. Kluwer Academic Publishers, 1998, ISBN 0-7923-8102-5
- R. K. M. Thambynayagam: The Diffusion Handbook: Applied Solutions for Engineers. McGraw-Hill, 2011, ISBN 978-0-07-175184-1
- van Brakel, J., Heertjes, P. M. (1974): Analysis of diffusion in macroporous media in terms of a porosity, a tortuosity and a constrictivity factor. Int. J. Heat Mass Transfer, 17: 1093–1103
