= Air flow bench =

Device for testing internal aerodynamics of engine parts

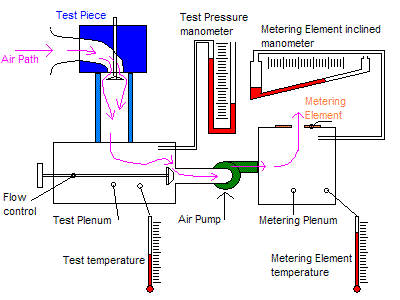
Typical Flow Bench schematic

An air flow bench is a device used for testing the internal aerodynamic qualities of an engine component and is related to the more familiar wind tunnel.

It is used primarily for testing the intake and exhaust ports of cylinder heads of internal combustion engines. It is also used to test the flow capabilities of any component such as air filters, carburetors, manifolds or any other part that is required to flow gas. A flow bench is one of the primary tools of high-performance engine builders, and porting cylinder heads would be strictly hit or miss without it.

A flow bench consists of an air pump of some sort, a metering element, pressure and temperature measuring instruments such as manometers, and various controls. The test piece is attached in series with the pump and measuring element and air is pumped through the whole system. Therefore, all the air passing through the metering element also passes through the test piece. Because the volumetric flow rate through the metering element is known and the flow through the test piece is the same, it is also known. The mass flow rate can be calculated using the known pressure and temperature data to calculate air densities, and multiplying by the volume flow rate.

== Air pump ==
The air pump used must be able to deliver the volume required at the pressure required. Most flow testing is done at 10 and 28 inches of water pressure (2.5 to 7 kilopascals). Although other test pressures will work, the results would have to be converted for comparison to the work of others. The pressure developed must account for the test pressure plus the loss across the metering element plus all other system losses. The greater the accuracy of the metering element the greater is the loss. Flow volume of between 100 and 600 cubic feet per minute (0.05 to 0.28 m^{3}/s) would serve almost all applications depending on the size of the engine under test.

Any type of pump that can deliver the required pressure difference and flow volume can be used. Most often used is the dynamic-compression centrifugal type compressor, which is familiar to most as being used in vacuum cleaners and turbochargers, but multistaged axial-flow compressor types, similar to those used in most jet engines, could work as well, although there would be little need for the added cost and complexities involved, as they typically don't require such a high flow rate as a jet engine, nor are they limited by the aerodynamic drag considerations which makes a narrow-diameter axial compressor more effective in jet engines than a centrifugal compressor of equal air flow. Positive displacement types such as piston compressors, or rotary types such as a Roots blower could also be used with suitable provisions for damping the pulsations in the air flow (however, other rotary types such as twin screw compressors are capable of providing a steady supply of compressed fluid). The pressure ratio of a single fan blade is too low and cannot be used.

== Metering element ==
There are several possible types of metering element in use. Flow benches ordinarily use one of three types: orifice plate, venturi meter and pitot/static tube, all of which deliver similar accuracy. Most commercial machines use orifice plates due to their simple construction and the ease of providing multiple flow ranges. Although the venturi offers substantial improvements in efficiency, its cost is higher.

== Instrumentation ==
Air flow conditions must be measured at two locations, across the test piece and across the metering element. The pressure difference across the test piece allows the standardization of tests from one to another. The pressure across the metering element allows calculation of the actual flow through the whole system.

The pressure across the test piece is typically measured with a U tube manometer while, for increased sensitivity and accuracy, the pressure difference across the metering element is measured with an inclined manometer. One end of each manometer is connected to its respective plenum chamber while the other is open to the atmosphere.

Ordinarily all flow bench manometers measure in inches of water although the inclined manometer's scale is usually replaced with a logarithmic scale reading in percentage of total flow of the selected metering element which makes flow calculation simpler.

Temperature must also be accounted for because the air pump will heat the air passing through it making the air down stream of it less dense and more viscous. This difference must be corrected for. Temperature is measured at the test piece plenum and at the metering element plenum. Correction factors are then applied during flow calculations. Some flow bench designs place the air pump after the metering element so that heating by the air pump is not as large a concern.

Additional manometers can be installed for use with hand held probes, which are used to explore local flow conditions in the port.

== Flow bench data ==
The air flow bench can give a wealth of data about the characteristics of a cylinder head or whatever part is tested. The result of main interest is bulk flow. It is the volume of air that flows through the port in a given time. Expressed in cubic feet per minute or cubic meters per second/minute.

Valve lift can be expressed as an actual dimension in decimal inches or mm. It can also be specified as a ratio between a characteristic diameter and the lift L/D. Most often used is the valve head diameter. Normally engines have an L/D ratio from 0 up to a maximum of 0.35. For example, a 1-inch-diameter (25 mm) valve would be lifted a maximum of 0.350 inch. During flow testing the valve would be set at L/D 0.05 0.1 0.15 0.2 0.25 0.3 and readings taken successively. This allows the comparison of efficiencies of ports with other valve sizes, as the valve lift is proportional rather than absolute. For comparison with tests by others the characteristic diameter used to determine lift must be the same.

Flow coefficients are determined by comparing the actual flow of a test piece to the theoretical flow of a perfect orifice of equal area. Thus the flow coefficient should be a close measure of efficiency. It cannot be exact because the L/D does not indicate the actual minimum size of the duct.

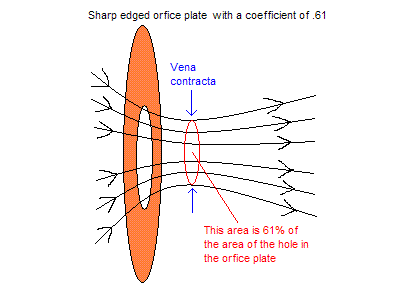
A real orifice plate showing how the fluid would actually flow

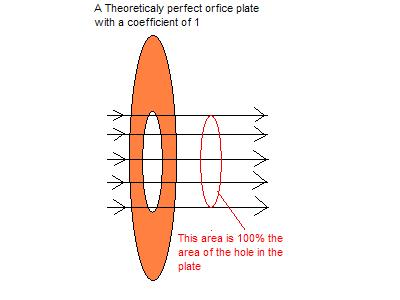
A theoretical orifice plate showing perfect flow which is used as a standard for comparing the efficiencies of real flows

An orifice with a flow coefficient of 0.59 would flow the same amount of fluid as a perfect orifice with 59% of its area or 59% of the flow of a perfect orifice with the same area (orifice plates of the type shown would have a coefficient of between 0.58 and 0.62 depending on the precise details of construction and the surrounding installation).

Valve/port coefficient is non dimensional and is derived by multiplying a characteristic physical area of the port and by the bulk flow figures and comparing the result to an ideal orifice of the same area. It is here that air flow bench norms differ from fluid dynamics or aerodynamics at large. The coefficient may be based on the inner valve seat diameter, the outer valve head diameter, the port throat area or the valve open curtain area. Each of these methods are valid for some purpose but none of them represents the true minimum area for the valve/port in question and each results in a different flow coefficient. The great difficulty of measuring the actual minimum area at all the various valve lifts precludes using this as a characteristic measurement. This is due to the minimum area changing shape and location throughout the lift cycle. Because of this non standardization, port flow coefficients are not "true" flow coefficients, which would be based on the actual minimum area in the flow path. Which method to choose depends on what use is intended for the data. Engine simulation applications each require their own specification. If the result is to be compared to the work of others then the same method would have to be selected.

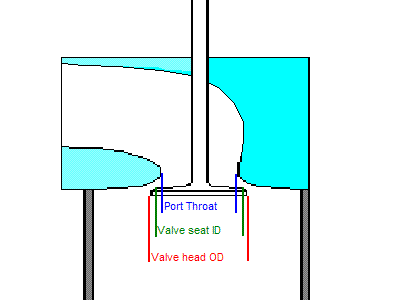
Various characteristic measurements used to determine flow coefficients

Using extra instrumentation (manometers and probes) the detailed flow through the port can be mapped by measuring multiple points within the port with probes. Using these tools, the velocity profile throughout the port can be mapped which gives insight into what the port is doing and what might be done to improve it.

Of less interest is mass flow per minute or second since the test is not of a running engine which would be affected by it. It is the weight of air that flows through the port in a given time. Expressed in pounds per minute/hour or kilograms per second/minute. Mass flow is derived from the volume flow result to which a density correction is applied.

With the information gathered on the flow bench, engine power curve and system dynamics can be roughly estimated by applying various formulae. With the advent of accurate engine simulation software, however, it is much more useful to use flow data to create an engine model for a simulator.

Determining air velocity is a useful part of flow testing. For incompressible flow (below 230 Ft/s or 70 M/s this equation gives a less than 1% error corresponding to a test pressure of 12" of water or 306mm of water) it is calculated as follows:

For one set of English units

$$V \approx 1096.7 \sqrt{\frac{H}{d}}$$

Where:

V, velocity in feet per minute
H, pressure drop across test piece in inches of water measured by the test pressure manometer
d, density of air in pounds per cubic foot (0.075 pound per cubic foot at standard conditions)

For SI units

$$V = \sqrt{\frac{2H}{d}}$$

Where:

V, velocity in meters per second
H, pressure drop across test piece in pascals measured by the test pressure manometer
d, density of air in kilograms per cubic meter (1.20 kilograms per cubic meter at standard conditions)

This represents the highest speed of the air in the flow path of a normally shaped port, at or near the section of minimum area (through the valve seat at low values of L/D for instance). That would not apply to other shapes such as a venturi tube where the local speed in the throat can be much higher than indicated by the pressure drop across the whole system.(When a pitot tube is used to measure velocities (adiabatic) above 230 Ft/s or 70 M/s, the error due to compressibility increases progressively with this formula from 1% to ~26% at mach 1)

Once velocity has been calculated, the volume can be calculated by multiplying the velocity by the orifice area times its flow coefficient.

== Limitations ==
A flow bench is capable of giving flow data which is closely but not perfectly related to actual engine performance. There are a number of limiting factors which contribute to the discrepancy.

=== Steady state flow vs dynamic flow ===
A flow bench tests ports under a steady pressure difference while in the actual engine the pressure difference varies widely during the whole cycle. The exact flow conditions existing in the flow bench test exist only fleetingly if at all in an actual running engine. Running engines cause the air to flow in strong waves rather than the steady stream of the flow bench. This acceleration/deceleration of the fuel/air column causes effects not accounted for in flow bench tests.

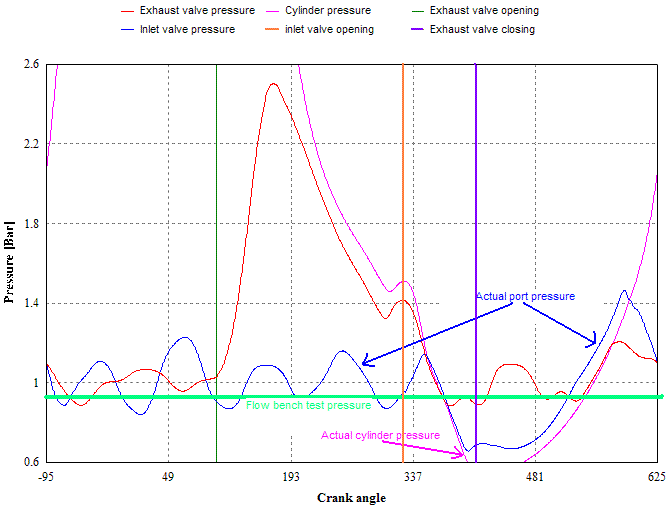
Comparison of flow bench test pressure to actual engine pressures predicted by an engine simulation program

This graph, generated with an engine simulation program, shows how widely the pressures vary in a running engine vs. the steady test pressure of the flow bench.

(Note, on the graph, that, in this case, when the intake valve opens, the cylinder pressure is above atmospheric (nearly 50% above or 1.5 bar or 150 kPa). This will cause reverse flow into the intake port until pressure in the cylinder falls below the ports pressure).

=== Pressure differential ===
The coefficient of the port may change somewhat at different pressure differentials due to changes in Reynolds number regime leading to a possible loss of dynamic similitude. Flow bench test pressure are typically conducted at 10 to 28 inches of water (2.5 to 7 kPa) while a real engine may see 190 inches of water (47 kPa) pressure difference.

=== Air only vs mixed gas/fuel mist flow ===
The flow bench tests using only air while a real engine usually uses air mixed with fuel droplets and fuel vapor, which is significantly different. Evaporating fuel passing through the port-runner has the effect of adding gas to and lowering the temperature of the air stream along the runner and giving the outlet flow rate slightly higher than the flow rate entering the port-runner. A port which flows dry air well might cause fuel droplets to fall out of suspension causing a loss of power not indicated by flow figures alone.

=== Bulk flow vs flow velocity ===
Large ports and valves can show high flow rates on a flow bench but the velocity can be lowered to the point that the gas dynamics of a real engine are ruined. Overly large ports also contribute to fuel fall out.

=== Even room temperature vs. uneven high temperature ===
A running engine is much hotter than room temperature and the temperature in various parts of the system vary widely. This affects the actual flow, fuel effects as well as the dynamic wave effects in the engine which do not exist on the flow bench.

=== Physical and mechanical differences ===
The proximity, shape and movement of the piston as well as the movement of the valve itself significantly alters the flow conditions in a real engine that do not exist in flow bench tests.

=== Exhaust port conditions ===
The flow simulated on a flow bench bears almost no similarity to the flow in a real exhaust port. Here even the coefficients measured on flow benches are inaccurate. This is due to the very high and wide-ranging pressures and temperatures. From the graph above it can be seen that the pressure in the port reaches 2.5 bar (250 kPa) and the cylinder pressure at opening is 6 bar (600 kPa) and more. This is many times more than the capabilities of a typical flow bench of 0.06 bar (6 kPa).

The flow in a real exhaust port can easily be sonic with choked flow occurring and even supersonic flow in areas. The very high temperature causes the viscosity of the gas to increase, all of which alters the Reynolds number drastically.

Added to the above is the profound effect that downstream elements have on the flow of the exhaust port. Far more than upstream elements found on the intake side.

Exhaust port size and flow information might be considered as vague, but there are certain guidelines which are used when creating a base-line to optimum performance. This base line, of course, is further tuned and qualified through a dynamometer.

== See also ==
- Air flow meter
