= Electroviscous effects =

Type of electrochemical effect

Electroviscous effects, in chemistry of colloids and surface chemistry, according to an IUPAC definition, are the effects of the particle surface charge on viscosity of a fluid.

Viscoelectric is an effect by which an electric field near a charged interface influences the structure of the surrounding fluid and affects the viscosity of the fluid.

Kinematic viscosity of a fluid, η, can be expressed as a function of electric potential gradient (electric field), $\vec E$, by an equation in the form:

$\eta=\eta_0 \left(1+ f\, \lVert {\vec{E}}\rVert^{2}\right)$

where f is the viscoelectric coefficient of the fluid.

The value of f for water (ambient temperature) has been estimated to be (0.5–1.0) × 10^{−15} V^{−2} m^{2}.

== See also ==
- Constrictivity
- Electrorheological fluid
- Wien effect
