= Wien effect =

Electrochemical surface effect

The Wien effect is the experimentally observed increase in ionic mobility or conductivity of electrolytes at very high gradient of electrical potential. A theoretical explanation has been proposed by Lars Onsager.

A related phenomenon is known as the Second Wien Effect or the dissociation field effect, and it involves increased dissociation constants of weak acids at high electrical gradients. The dissociation of weak chemical bases is unaffected.

The effects are important at very high electrical fields (10^{8} – 10^{9} V/m), like those observed in electrical double layers at interfaces or at the surfaces of electrodes in electrochemistry.

More generally, the electric field effect (directly, through space rather than through chemical bonds) on chemical behaviour of systems (e.g., on reaction rates) is known as the field effect or the direct effect.

The terms are named after Max Wien.

== See also ==
- Debye length
- Electroviscous effects
- Field effect (semiconductor)
- Field-effect mobility
