= Lattice diffusion coefficient =

Atomic diffusion within a crystalline lattice

Interstitial Atomic diffusion across a 4-coordinated lattice. Note that the atoms often block each other from moving to adjacent sites. As per Fick’s law, the net flux (or movement of atoms) is always in the opposite direction of the concentration gradient.

H^{+} ions diffusing in an O^{2-} lattice of superionic ice

In condensed matter physics, lattice diffusion (also called bulk or volume diffusion) refers to atomic diffusion within a crystalline lattice, which occurs by either interstitial or substitutional mechanisms. In interstitial lattice diffusion, a diffusant (such as carbon in an iron alloy), will diffuse in between the lattice structure of another crystalline element. In substitutional lattice diffusion (self-diffusion for example), the atom can only move by switching places with another atom. Substitutional lattice diffusion is often contingent upon the availability of point vacancies throughout the crystal lattice. Diffusing particles migrate from point vacancy to point vacancy by the rapid, essentially random jumping about (jump diffusion). Since the prevalence of point vacancies increases in accordance with the Arrhenius equation, the rate of crystal solid state diffusion increases with temperature. For a single atom in a defect-free crystal, the movement can be described by the "random walk" model.

== Diffusion Coefficient for Interstitial Diffusion ==
An atom diffuses in the interstitial mechanism by passing from one interstitial site to one of its nearest neighboring interstitial sites. The movement of atoms can be described as jumps, and the interstitial diffusion coefficient depends on the jump frequency. The jump frequency, $\Gamma$, is given by:

$\Gamma=zv \exp\left ( \frac{-\Delta G_m}{RT} \right )$

where

- $z$ is the number of nearest neighboring interstitial sites.
- $v$ is vibration frequency of the interstitial atom due to thermal energy.
- $\Delta G_m$ is the activation energy for the migration of the interstitial atom between sites.
- $R$ is the gas constant.
- $T$ is the thermodynamic temperature.

$\Delta G_m$ can be expressed as the sum of activation enthalpy term $\Delta H_m$ and the activation entropy term $-T\Delta S_m$, which gives the diffusion coefficient as:

$D = \left [ \frac{1}{z} \alpha^2 zv \exp\frac{\Delta S_m }{R} \right ]\exp\frac{-\Delta H_m }{RT}$

where

- $\alpha$ is the jump distance.

The diffusion coefficient can be simplified to an Arrhenius equation form:

$D = D_0 \exp\frac{-Q_I }{RT}$

where

- $D_0$ is a temperature-independent material constant. $D_0 = \tfrac{1}{z} \alpha^2 zv \exp\tfrac{\Delta S_m }{R}$
- $Q_I$ is the activation enthalpy. $Q_I = \Delta H_m$

In the case of interstitial diffusion, the activation enthalpy $Q_I$ is only dependent on the activation energy barrier to the movement of interstitial atoms from one site to another. The diffusion coefficient increases exponentially with temperature at a rate determined by the activation enthalpy $Q_I$.

== Diffusion Coefficient for Substitution Diffusion ==
=== Self-Diffusion ===
The rate of self-diffusion can be measured experimentally by introducing radioactive A atoms (A*) into pure A and measuring the rate at which penetration occurs at various temperatures. A* and A atoms have approximately identical jump frequencies since they are chemically identical. The diffusion coefficient of A* and A can be related to the jump frequency and expressed as:

$D_A^* = D_A = \frac{1}{6} \alpha^2 \Gamma$

where

- $D_A^*$ is the diffusion coefficient of radioactive A atoms in pure A.
- $D_A$ is the diffusion coefficient of A atoms in pure A.
- $\Gamma$ is the jump frequency for both the A* and A atoms.
- $\alpha$ is the jump distance.

An atom can make a successful jump when there are vacancies nearby and when it has enough thermal energy to overcome the energy barrier to migration. The number of successful jumps an atom will make in one second, or the jump frequency, can be expressed as:

$\Gamma = zv X_v \exp\frac{-\Delta G_m }{RT}$

where

- $z$ is the number of nearest neighbors.
- $v$ is the frequency of temperature-independent atomic vibration.
- $X_v$ is the vacancy fraction of the lattice.
- $\Delta G_m$ is the activation energy barrier to atomic migration.

In thermodynamic equilibrium,

$X_v = X_v^e = \exp\frac{-\Delta G_v }{RT}$

where $\Delta G_v$ is the free energy of vacancy formation for a single vacancy.

The diffusion coefficient in thermodynamic equilibrium can be expressed with $\Delta G_m$ and $\Delta G_v$, giving:

$D_A = \frac{1}{6} \alpha^2 zv \exp\frac{-(\Delta G_m+\Delta G_v)}{RT}$

Substituting ΔG = ΔH – TΔS gives:

$D_A = \frac{1}{6} \alpha^2 zv \exp\frac{\Delta S_m+\Delta S_v}{R} \exp\frac{-(\Delta H_m+\Delta H_v)}{RT}$

The diffusion coefficient can be simplified to an Arrhenius equation form:

$D_A = D_0 \exp\frac{-Q_S }{RT}$

where

- $D_0$ is approximately a constant. $D_0 = \frac{1}{6} \alpha^2 zv \exp\frac{\Delta S_m+\Delta S_v}{R}$
- $Q_S$ is the activation enthalpy. $Q_S = \Delta H_m + \Delta H_v$

Compared to that of interstitial diffusion, the activation energy for self-diffusion has an extra term (ΔH_{v}). Since self-diffusion requires the presence of vacancies whose concentration depends on ΔH_{v}.

=== Vacancy Diffusion ===
Diffusion of a vacancy can be viewed as the jumping of a vacancy onto an atom site. It is the same process as the jumping of an atom into a vacant site but without the need to consider the probability of vacancy presence, since a vacancy is usually always surrounded by atom sites to which it can jump. A vacancy can have its own diffusion coefficient that is expressed as:

$D_v = \frac{1}{6} \alpha^2 \Gamma _v$

where $\Gamma_v$ is the jump frequency of a vacancy.

The diffusion coefficient can also be expressed in terms of enthalpy of migration ($\Delta H_m$) and entropy of migration ($\Delta S_m$) of a vacancy, which are the same as for the migration of a substitutional atom:

$D_v = \frac{1}{6} \alpha^2 zv \exp\frac{\Delta S_m}{R} \exp\frac{-\Delta H_m}{RT}$

Comparing the diffusion coefficient between self-diffusion and vacancy diffusion gives:

$D_v = \frac{D_A}{X_v^e}$

where the equilibrium vacancy fraction $X_v^e = \exp\frac{-\Delta G_v }{RT}$

=== Diffusion in a Binary System ===
In a system with multiple components (e.g. a binary alloy), the solvent (A) and the solute atoms (B) will not move in an equal rate. Each atomic species can be given its own intrinsic diffusion coefficient $\tilde{D}_A$ and $\tilde{D}_B$, expressing the diffusion of a certain species in the whole system. The interdiffusion coefficient $\tilde{D}$ is defined by the Darken's equation as:

$\tilde{D} = \tilde{D}_A X_B + \tilde{D}_B X_A$

where $X_A$ and $X_B$ are the amount fractions of species A and B, respectively.

== See also ==
- Kirkendall effect
- Phase transformations in solids
- Mass diffusivity
