= Diffusion =

Transport of dissolved species from the highest to the lowest concentration region

Some particles are dissolved in a glass of water. At first, the particles are all near one top corner of the glass. If the particles randomly move around ("diffuse") in the water, they eventually become distributed randomly and uniformly from an area of high concentration to an area of low, and organized (diffusion continues, but with no net flux).

Time lapse video of diffusion a dye dissolved in water into a gel.

Diffusion from a microscopic and b macroscopic point of view. Initially, there are solute molecules on the left side of a barrier (purple line) and none on the right. The barrier is removed, and the solute diffuses to fill the whole container. Top: A single molecule moves around randomly. Middle: With more molecules, there is a statistical trend that the solute fills the container more and more uniformly. Bottom: With an enormous number of solute molecules, all randomness is gone: The solute appears to move smoothly and deterministically from high-concentration areas to low-concentration areas. There is no microscopic force pushing molecules rightward, but there appears to be one in the bottom panel. This apparent force is called an entropic force.

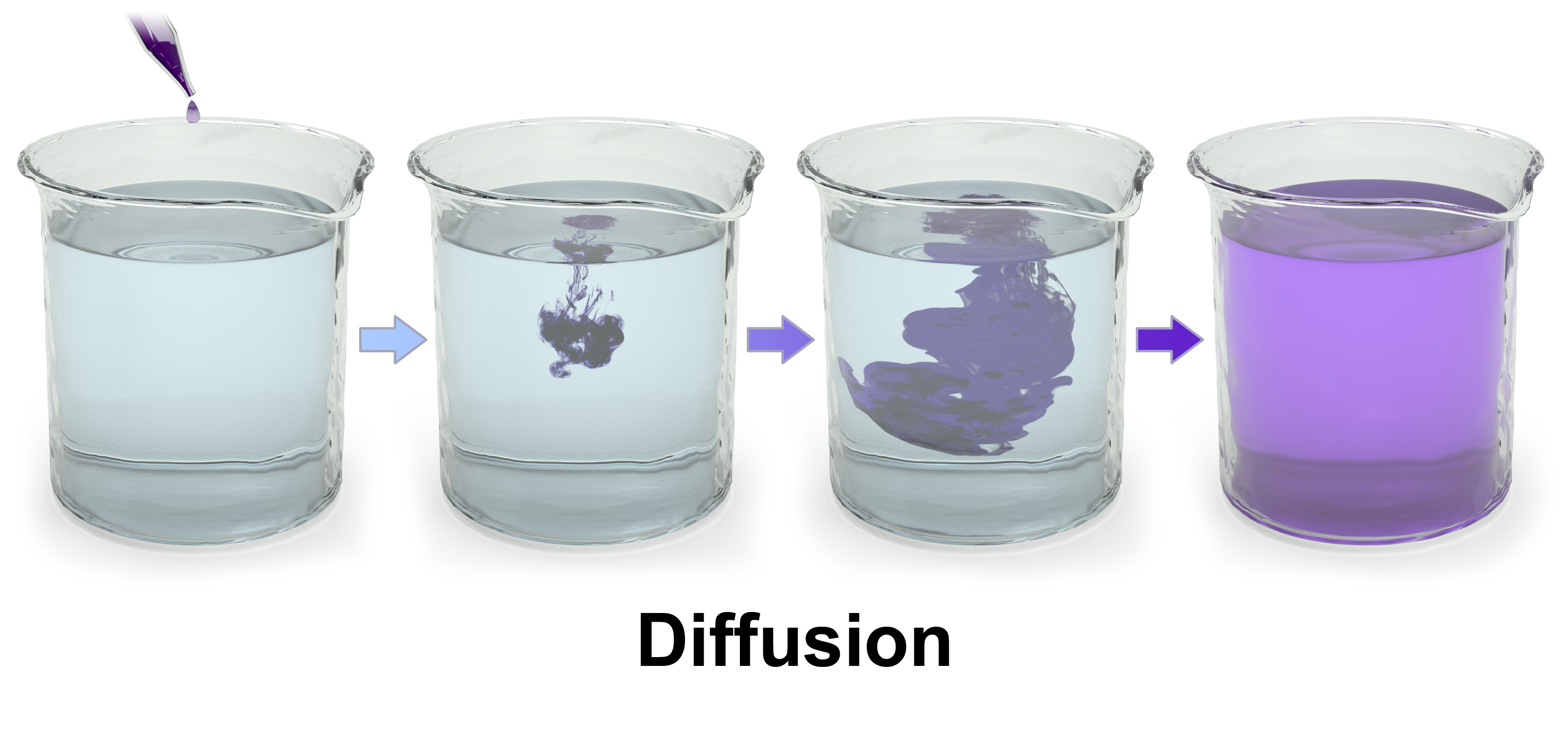
Three-dimensional rendering of diffusion of purple dye in water.

Diffusion is the net movement of anything (for example, atoms, ions, molecules, energy) generally from a region of higher concentration to a region of lower concentration. Diffusion is driven by a gradient in Gibbs free energy or chemical potential. It is possible to diffuse "uphill" from a region of lower concentration to a region of higher concentration, as in spinodal decomposition. Diffusion is a stochastic process due to the inherent randomness of the diffusing entity and can be used to model many real-life stochastic scenarios. Therefore, diffusion and the corresponding mathematical models are used in several fields beyond physics, such as statistics, probability theory, information theory, neural networks, finance, and marketing.

The concept of diffusion is widely used in many fields, including physics (particle diffusion), chemistry, biology, sociology, economics, statistics, data science, and finance (diffusion of people, ideas, data and price values). The central idea of diffusion, however, is common to all of these: a substance or collection undergoing diffusion spreads out from a point or location at which there is a higher concentration of that substance or collection.

A gradient is the change in the value of a quantity; for example, concentration, pressure, or temperature with the change in another variable, usually distance. A change in concentration over a distance is called a concentration gradient, a change in pressure over a distance is called a pressure gradient, and a change in temperature over a distance is called a temperature gradient.

The word diffusion derives from the Latin word, diffundere, which means "to spread out".

A distinguishing feature of diffusion is that it depends on particle random walk, and results in mixing or mass transport without requiring directed bulk motion. Bulk motion, or bulk flow, is the characteristic of advection. The term convection is used to describe the combination of both transport phenomena.

If a diffusion process can be described by Fick's laws, it is called a normal diffusion (or Fickian diffusion). Otherwise, it is called an anomalous diffusion (or non-Fickian diffusion).

When talking about the extent of diffusion, two length scales are used in two different scenarios ($D$ is the diffusion coefficient, having dimensions area / time):

1. Brownian motion of an impulsive point source (for example, one single spray of perfume)—the square root of the mean squared displacement from this point. In Fickian diffusion, this is $\sqrt{2nDt}$, where $n$ is the dimension of this Brownian motion;
2. Constant concentration source in one dimension—the diffusion length. In Fickian diffusion, this is $2\sqrt{Dt}$.

== Diffusion vs. bulk flow ==
"Bulk flow" is the movement/flow of an entire body due to a pressure gradient (for example, water coming out of a tap). "Diffusion" is the gradual movement/dispersion of concentration within a body with no net movement of matter. An example of a process where both bulk motion and diffusion occur is human breathing.

First, there is a "bulk flow" process. The lungs are located in the thoracic cavity, which expands as the first step in external respiration. This expansion leads to an increase in volume of the alveoli in the lungs, which causes a decrease in pressure in the alveoli. This creates a pressure gradient between the air outside the body at relatively high pressure and the alveoli at relatively low pressure. The air moves down the pressure gradient through the airways of the lungs and into the alveoli until the pressure of the air and that in the alveoli are equal, that is, the movement of air by bulk flow stops once there is no longer a pressure gradient.

Second, there is a "diffusion" process. The air arriving in the alveoli has a higher concentration of oxygen than the "stale" air in the alveoli. The increase in oxygen concentration creates a concentration gradient for oxygen between the air in the alveoli and the blood in the capillaries that surround the alveoli. Oxygen then moves by diffusion, down the concentration gradient, into the blood. The other consequence of the air arriving in alveoli is that the concentration of carbon dioxide in the alveoli decreases. This creates a concentration gradient for carbon dioxide to diffuse from the blood into the alveoli, as fresh air has a very low concentration of carbon dioxide compared to the blood in the body.

Third, there is another "bulk flow" process. The pumping action of the heart then transports the blood around the body. As the left ventricle of the heart contracts, the volume decreases, which increases the pressure in the ventricle. This creates a pressure gradient between the heart and the capillaries, and blood moves through blood vessels by bulk flow down the pressure gradient.

== Diffusion in the context of different disciplines ==
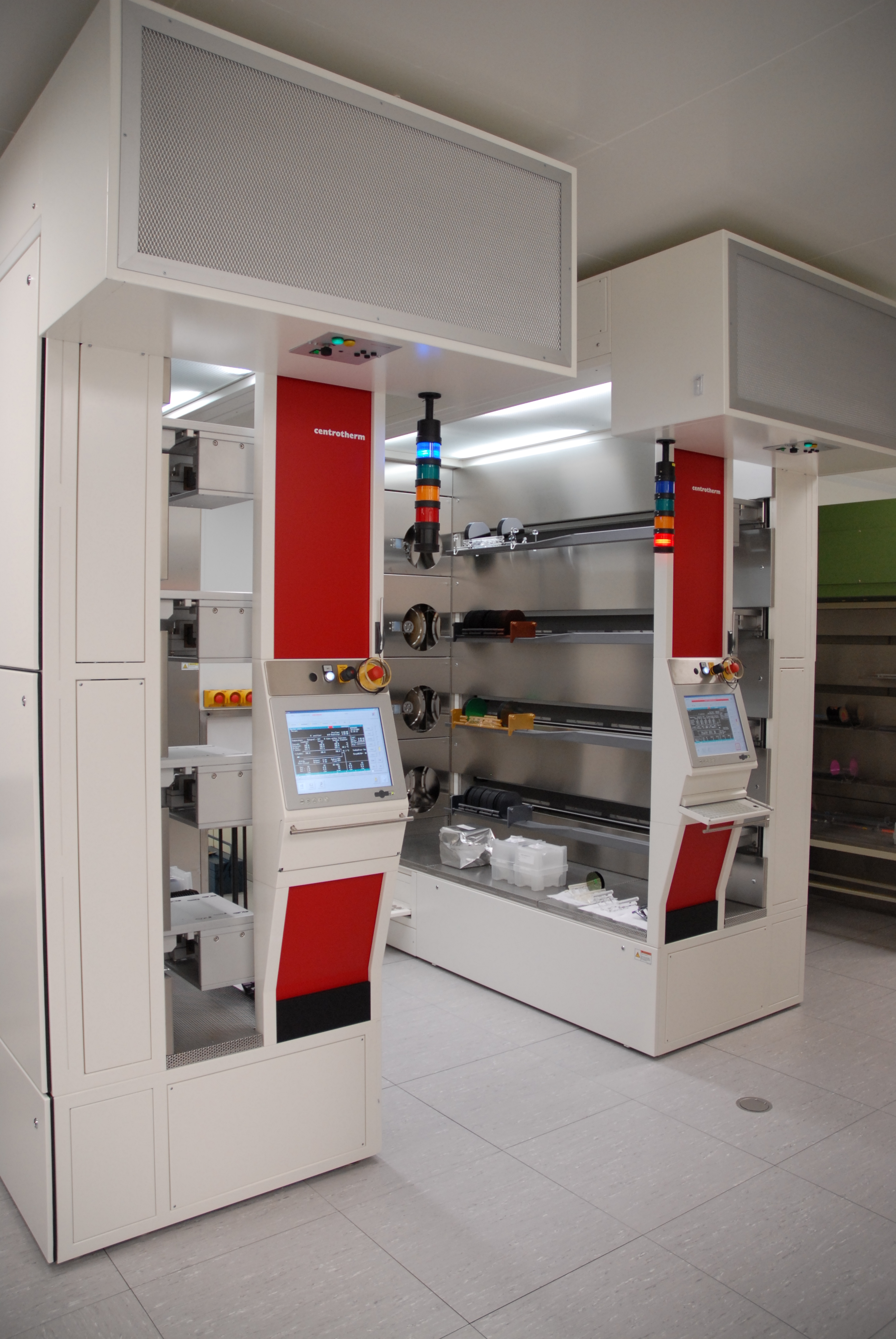
Diffusion furnaces used for thermal oxidation

There are two ways to introduce the notion of diffusion: either a phenomenological approach starting with Fick's laws of diffusion and their mathematical consequences, or a physical and atomistic one, by considering the random walk of the diffusing particles.

In the phenomenological approach, diffusion is the movement of a substance from a region of high concentration to a region of low concentration without bulk motion. According to Fick's laws, the diffusion flux is proportional to the negative gradient of concentrations. It goes from regions of higher concentration to regions of lower concentration. Sometime later, various generalizations of Fick's laws were developed in the frame of thermodynamics and non-equilibrium thermodynamics.

From the atomistic point of view, diffusion is considered as a result of the random walk of the diffusing particles. In molecular diffusion, the moving molecules in a gas, liquid, or solid are self-propelled by kinetic energy. Random walk of small particles in suspension in a fluid was discovered in 1827 by Robert Brown, who found that minute particle suspended in a liquid medium and just large enough to be visible under an optical microscope exhibit a rapid and continually irregular motion of particles known as Brownian movement. The theory of the Brownian motion and the atomistic backgrounds of diffusion were developed by Albert Einstein. The concept of diffusion is typically applied to any subject matter involving random walks in ensembles of individuals.

In chemistry and materials science, diffusion also refers to the movement of fluid molecules in porous solids. Different types of diffusion are distinguished in porous solids. Molecular diffusion occurs when the collision with another molecule is more likely than the collision with the pore walls. Under such conditions, the diffusivity is similar to that in a non-confined space and is proportional to the mean free path. Knudsen diffusion occurs when the pore diameter is comparable to or smaller than the mean free path of the molecule diffusing through the pore. Under this condition, the collision with the pore walls becomes gradually more likely and the diffusivity is lower. Finally there is configurational diffusion, which happens if the molecules have comparable size to that of the pore. Under this condition, the diffusivity is much lower compared to molecular diffusion and small differences in the kinetic diameter of the molecule cause large differences in diffusivity.

Biologists often use the terms "net movement" or "net diffusion" to describe the movement of ions or molecules by diffusion. For example, oxygen can diffuse through cell membranes so long as there is a higher concentration of oxygen outside the cell. However, because the movement of molecules is random, occasionally oxygen molecules move out of the cell (against the concentration gradient). Because there are more oxygen molecules outside the cell, the probability that oxygen molecules will enter the cell is higher than the probability that oxygen molecules will leave the cell. Therefore, the "net" movement of oxygen molecules (the difference between the number of molecules either entering or leaving the cell) is into the cell. In other words, there is a net movement of oxygen molecules down the concentration gradient.

In astronomy, atomic diffusion is used to model the stellar atmospheres of chemically peculiar stars. Diffusion of the elements is critical in understanding the surface composition of degenerate white dwarf stars and their evolution over time.

In machine learning and artificial intelligence, diffusion models, also known as diffusion-based generative models or score-based generative models, are a class of latent variable generative models. The goal of diffusion models is to learn a diffusion process for a given dataset, such that the process can generate new elements that are distributed similarly as the original dataset. Diffusion models were introduced in 2015 as a method to train a model that can sample from a highly complex probability distribution. They used techniques from non-equilibrium thermodynamics, especially diffusion.

== History of diffusion in physics ==
In the scope of time, diffusion in solids was used long before the theory of diffusion was created. For example, Pliny the Elder had previously described the cementation process, which produces steel from the element iron (Fe) through carbon diffusion. Another example is well known for many centuries, the diffusion of colors of stained glass or earthenware and Chinese ceramics.

In modern science, the first systematic experimental study of diffusion was performed by Thomas Graham. He studied diffusion in gases, and the main phenomenon was described by him in 1831–1833:

"...gases of different nature, when brought into contact, do not arrange themselves according to their density, the heaviest undermost, and the lighter uppermost, but they spontaneously diffuse, mutually and equally, through each other, and so remain in the intimate state of mixture for any length of time."

The measurements of Graham contributed to James Clerk Maxwell deriving, in 1867, the coefficient of diffusion for CO_{2} in the air. The error rate is less than 5%.

In 1855, Adolf Fick, the 26-year-old anatomy demonstrator from Zürich, proposed his law of diffusion. He used Graham's research, stating his goal as "the development of a fundamental law, for the operation of diffusion in a single element of space". He asserted a deep analogy between diffusion and conduction of heat or electricity, creating a formalism similar to Fourier's law for heat conduction (1822) and Ohm's law for electric current (1827).

Robert Boyle demonstrated diffusion in solids in the 17th century by penetration of zinc into a copper coin. Nevertheless, diffusion in solids was not systematically studied until the second part of the 19th century. William Chandler Roberts-Austen, the well-known British metallurgist and former assistant of Thomas Graham studied systematically solid state diffusion on the example of gold in lead in 1896. :

"... My long connection with Graham's researches made it almost a duty to attempt to extend his work on liquid diffusion to metals."

In 1858, Rudolf Clausius introduced the concept of the mean free path. In the same year, James Clerk Maxwell developed the first atomistic theory of transport processes in gases. The modern atomistic theory of diffusion and Brownian motion was developed by Albert Einstein, Marian Smoluchowski and Jean-Baptiste Perrin. Ludwig Boltzmann, in the development of the atomistic backgrounds of the macroscopic transport processes, introduced the Boltzmann equation, which has served mathematics and physics with a source of transport process ideas and concerns for more than 140 years.

In 1920–1921, George de Hevesy measured self-diffusion using radioisotopes. He studied self-diffusion of radioactive isotopes of lead in the liquid and solid lead.

Yakov Frenkel (sometimes, Jakov/Jacob Frenkel) proposed, and elaborated in 1926, the idea of diffusion in crystals through local defects (vacancies and interstitial atoms). He concluded, the diffusion process in condensed matter is an ensemble of elementary jumps and quasichemical interactions of particles and defects. He introduced several mechanisms of diffusion and found rate constants from experimental data.

Sometime later, Carl Wagner and Walter H. Schottky developed Frenkel's ideas about mechanisms of diffusion further. Presently, it is universally recognized that atomic defects are necessary to mediate diffusion in crystals.

Henry Eyring, with co-authors, applied his theory of absolute reaction rates to Frenkel's quasichemical model of diffusion. The analogy between reaction kinetics and diffusion leads to various nonlinear versions of Fick's law.

== Models ==
=== Definition of diffusion flux ===
Each model of diffusion expresses the diffusion flux with the use of concentrations, densities and their derivatives. Flux is a vector $\mathbf{J}$ representing the quantity and direction of transfer. Given a small area $\Delta S$ with normal $\boldsymbol{\nu}$, the transfer of a physical quantity $N$ through the area $\Delta S$ per time $\Delta t$ is

$$\Delta N = (\mathbf{J},\boldsymbol{\nu}) \,\Delta S \,\Delta t +o(\Delta S \,\Delta t)\, ,$$

where $(\mathbf{J},\boldsymbol{\nu})$ is the inner product and $o(\cdots)$ is the little-o notation. If we use the notation of vector area $\Delta \mathbf{S}=\boldsymbol{\nu} \, \Delta S$ then

$$\Delta N = (\mathbf{J}, \Delta \mathbf{S}) \, \Delta t +o(\Delta \mathbf{S} \,\Delta t)\, .$$

The dimension of the diffusion flux is [flux] = [quantity]/([time]·[area]). The diffusing physical quantity $N$ may be the number of particles, mass, energy, electric charge, or any other scalar extensive quantity. For its density, $n$, the diffusion equation has the form

$$\frac{\partial n}{\partial t}= - \nabla \cdot \mathbf{J} +W \, ,$$

where $W$ is intensity of any local source of this quantity (for example, the rate of a chemical reaction). For the diffusion equation, the no-flux boundary conditions can be formulated as $(\mathbf{J}(x),\boldsymbol{\nu}(x))=0$ on the boundary, where $\boldsymbol{\nu}$ is the normal to the boundary at point $x$.

=== Normal single component concentration gradient ===
Fick's first law: The diffusion flux, $\mathbf{J}$, is proportional to the negative gradient of spatial concentration, $n(x,t)$:

$$\mathbf{J}=-D(x) \,\nabla n(x,t),$$

where D is the diffusion coefficient, which can be estimated for a given mixture using, for example, the empirical Vignes correlation model or the physically motivated entropy scaling. The corresponding diffusion equation (Fick's second law) is

$$\frac{\partial n(x,t)}{\partial t}=\nabla\cdot( D(x) \,\nabla n(x,t))\, .$$

In case the diffusion coefficient is independent of $x$, Fick's second law can be simplified to

$$\frac{\partial n(x,t)}{\partial t}=D \, \Delta n(x,t)\ ,$$

where $\Delta$ is the Laplace operator,

$$\Delta n(x,t) = \sum_i \frac{\partial^2 n(x,t)}{\partial x_i^2} \ .$$

=== Multicomponent diffusion and thermodiffusion ===
Fick's law describes diffusion of an admixture in a medium. The concentration of this admixture should be small and the gradient of this concentration should be also small. The driving force of diffusion in Fick's law is the antigradient of concentration, $-\nabla n$.

In 1931, Lars Onsager included the multicomponent transport processes in the general context of linear non-equilibrium thermodynamics. For multi-component transport,

$$\mathbf{J}_i=\sum_j L_{ij} X_j \, ,$$

where $\mathbf{J}_i$ is the flux of the $i$th physical quantity (component), $X_j$ is the $j$th thermodynamic force and $L_{ij}$ is Onsager's matrix of kinetic transport coefficients.

The thermodynamic forces for the transport processes were introduced by Onsager as the space gradients of the derivatives of the entropy density $s$ (he used the term "force" in quotation marks or "driving force"):

$$X_i= \nabla \frac {\partial s(n)}{\partial n_i}\, ,$$

where $n_i$ are the "thermodynamic coordinates". For the heat and mass transfer one can take $n_0=u$ (the density of internal energy) and $n_i$ is the concentration of the $i$th component. The corresponding driving forces are the space vectors

$X_0= \nabla \frac{1}{T}\ , \;\;\; X_i= - \nabla \frac{\mu_i}{T} \; (i >0) ,$ because $\mathrm{d}s = \frac{1}{T} \,\mathrm{d}u-\sum_{i \geq 1} \frac{\mu_i}{T} \, {\rm d} n_i$

where T is the absolute temperature and $\mu_i$ is the chemical potential of the $i$th component. It should be stressed that the separate diffusion equations describe the mixing or mass transport without bulk motion. Therefore, the terms with variation of the total pressure are neglected. It is possible for diffusion of small admixtures and for small gradients.

For the linear Onsager equations, we must take the thermodynamic forces in the linear approximation near equilibrium:

$$X_i= \sum_{k \geq 0} \left.\frac{\partial^2 s(n)}{\partial n_i \, \partial n_k}\right|_{n=n^*} \nabla n_k \ ,$$

where the derivatives of $s$ are calculated at equilibrium $n^*$. The matrix of the kinetic coefficients $L_{ij}$ should be symmetric (Onsager reciprocal relations) and positive definite (for the entropy growth).

The transport equations are

$$\frac{\partial n_i}{\partial t}= - \operatorname{div} \mathbf{J}_i =- \sum_{j\geq 0} L_{ij}\operatorname{div} X_j = \sum_{k\geq 0} \left[-\sum_{j\geq 0} L_{ij} \left.\frac{\partial^2 s(n)}{\partial n_j \, \partial n_k}\right|_{n=n^*}\right] \, \Delta n_k\ .$$

Here, all the indexes i, j, k = 0, 1, 2, ... are related to the internal energy (0) and various components. The expression in the square brackets is the matrix $D_{ik}$ of the diffusion (i,k > 0), thermodiffusion (i > 0, k = 0 or k > 0, i = 0) and thermal conductivity (i = k = 0) coefficients.

Under isothermal conditions T = constant. The relevant thermodynamic potential is the free energy (or the free entropy). The thermodynamic driving forces for the isothermal diffusion are antigradients of chemical potentials, $-(1/T)\,\nabla\mu_j$, and the matrix of diffusion coefficients is

$$D_{ik}=\frac{1}{T}\sum_{j\geq 1} L_{ij} \left.\frac{\partial \mu_j(n,T)} { \partial n_k}\right|_{n=n^*}$$

(i,k > 0).

There is intrinsic arbitrariness in the definition of the thermodynamic forces and kinetic coefficients because they are not measurable separately and only their combinations $\sum_j L_{ij}X_j$ can be measured. For example, in the original work of Onsager the thermodynamic forces include additional multiplier T, whereas in the Course of Theoretical Physics this multiplier is omitted but the sign of the thermodynamic forces is opposite. All these changes are supplemented by the corresponding changes in the coefficients and do not affect the measurable quantities.

==== Nondiagonal diffusion must be nonlinear ====
The formalism of linear irreversible thermodynamics (Onsager) generates the systems of linear diffusion equations in the form

$$\frac{\partial c_i}{\partial t} = \sum_j D_{ij} \, \Delta c_j.$$

If the matrix of diffusion coefficients is diagonal, then this system of equations is just a collection of decoupled Fick's equations for various components. Assume that diffusion is non-diagonal, for example, $D_{12} \neq 0$, and consider the state with $c_2 = \cdots = c_n = 0$. At this state, $\partial c_2 / \partial t = D_{12} \, \Delta c_1$. If $D_{12} \, \Delta c_1(x) < 0$ at some points, then $c_2(x)$ becomes negative at these points in a short time. Therefore, linear non-diagonal diffusion does not preserve positivity of concentrations. Non-diagonal equations of multicomponent diffusion must be non-linear.

=== Applied forces ===
The Einstein relation (kinetic theory) connects the diffusion coefficient and the mobility (the ratio of the particle's terminal drift velocity to an applied force). For charged particles:

$$D = \frac{\mu \, k_\text{B} T}{q},$$

where D is the diffusion constant, μ is the "mobility", k_{B} is the Boltzmann constant, T is the absolute temperature, and q is the elementary charge, that is, the charge of one electron.

Below, to combine in the same formula the chemical potential μ and the mobility, we use for mobility the notation $\mathfrak{m}$.

=== Diffusion across a membrane ===
The mobility-based approach was further applied by T. Teorell. In 1935, he studied the diffusion of ions through a membrane. He formulated the essence of his approach in the formula:

the flux is equal to mobility × concentration × force per gram-ion.

This is the so-called Teorell formula. The term "gram-ion" ("gram-particle") is used for a quantity of a substance that contains the Avogadro number of ions (particles). The common modern term is mole.

The force under isothermal conditions consists of two parts:

1. Diffusion force caused by concentration gradient: $-RT \frac{1}{n} \, \nabla n = -RT \, \nabla (\ln(n/n^\text{eq}))$.
2. Electrostatic force caused by electric potential gradient: $q \, \nabla \varphi$.

Here R is the gas constant, T is the absolute temperature, n is the concentration, the equilibrium concentration is marked by a superscript "eq", q is the charge and φ is the electric potential.

The simple but crucial difference between the Teorell formula and the Onsager laws is the concentration factor in the Teorell expression for the flux. In the Einstein–Teorell approach, if for the finite force the concentration tends to zero then the flux also tends to zero, whereas the Onsager equations violate this simple and physically obvious rule.

The general formulation of the Teorell formula for non-perfect systems under isothermal conditions is

$$\mathbf{J} = \mathfrak{m} \exp\left(\frac{\mu - \mu_0}{RT}\right)(-\nabla \mu + (\text{external force per mole})),$$

where μ is the chemical potential, μ_{0} is the standard value of the chemical potential. The expression $a = \exp\left(\frac{\mu - \mu_0}{RT}\right)$ is the so-called activity. It measures the "effective concentration" of a species in a non-ideal mixture. In this notation, the Teorell formula for the flux has a very simple form

$$\mathbf{J} = \mathfrak{m} a (-\nabla \mu + (\text{external force per mole})).$$

The standard derivation of the activity includes a normalization factor and for small concentrations $a = n/n^\ominus + o(n/n^\ominus)$, where $n^\ominus$ is the standard concentration. Therefore, this formula for the flux describes the flux of the normalized dimensionless quantity $n/n^\ominus$:

$$\frac{\partial (n/n^\ominus)}{\partial t} = \nabla \cdot [\mathfrak{m} a (\nabla \mu - (\text{external force per mole}))].$$

=== Ballistic time scale ===
The Einstein model neglects the inertia of the diffusing partial. The alternative Langevin equation starts with Newton's second law of motion:

$$m \frac{d^2x}{dt^2} = -\frac{1}{\mu}\frac{dx}{dt} + F(t)$$

where

- x is the position.
- μ is the mobility of the particle in the fluid or gas, which can be calculated using the Einstein relation (kinetic theory).
- m is the mass of the particle.
- F is the random force applied to the particle.
- t is time.

Solving this equation, one obtained the time-dependent diffusion constant in the long-time limit and when the particle is significantly denser than the surrounding fluid,

$$D(t) = \mu \, k_{\rm B} T(1-e^{-t/(m\mu)})$$

where

- k_{B} is the Boltzmann constant;
- T is the absolute temperature.
- μ is the mobility of the particle in the fluid or gas, which can be calculated using the Einstein relation (kinetic theory).
- m is the mass of the particle.
- t is time.

At long time scales, Einstein's result is recovered, but short time scales, the ballistic regime are also explained. Moreover, unlike the Einstein approach, a velocity can be defined, leading to the Fluctuation-dissipation theorem, connecting the competition between friction and random forces in defining the temperature.

=== Jumps on the surface and in solids ===
Diffusion in the monolayer: oscillations near temporary equilibrium positions and jumps to the nearest free places.

Diffusion of reagents on the surface of a catalyst may play an important role in heterogeneous catalysis. The model of diffusion in the ideal monolayer is based on the jumps of the reagents on the nearest free places. This model was used for CO on Pt oxidation under low gas pressure.

The system includes several reagents $A_1,A_2,\ldots, A_m$ on the surface. Their surface concentrations are $c_1,c_2,\ldots, c_m.$ The surface is a lattice of the adsorption places. Each reagent molecule fills a place on the surface. Some of the places are free. The concentration of the free places is $z=c_0$. The sum of all $c_i$ (including free places) is constant, the density of adsorption places b.

The jump model gives for the diffusion flux of $A_i$ (i = 1, ..., n):

$$\mathbf{J}_i=-D_i[z \, \nabla c_i - c_i \nabla z]\, .$$

The corresponding diffusion equation is:

$$\frac{\partial c_i}{\partial t}=- \operatorname{div}\mathbf{J}_i=D_i[z \, \Delta c_i - c_i \, \Delta z] \, .$$

Due to the conservation law, $z=b-\sum_{i=1}^n c_i \, ,$ and we have the system of m diffusion equations. For one component we get Fick's law and linear equations because $(b-c) \,\nabla c- c\,\nabla(b-c) = b\,\nabla c$. For two and more components the equations are nonlinear.

If all particles can exchange their positions with their closest neighbours then a simple generalization gives

$$\mathbf{J}_i=-\sum_j D_{ij}[c_j \,\nabla c_i - c_i \,\nabla c_j]$$
$$\frac{\partial c_i}{\partial t}=\sum_j D_{ij}[c_j \, \Delta c_i - c_i \,\Delta c_j]$$

where $D_{ij} = D_{ji} \geq 0$ is a symmetric matrix of coefficients that characterize the intensities of jumps. The free places (vacancies) should be considered as special "particles" with concentration $c_0$.

Various versions of these jump models are also suitable for simple diffusion mechanisms in solids.

=== Porous media ===
For diffusion in porous media the basic equations are (if Φ is constant):

$$\mathbf{J}=- \phi D \,\nabla n^m$$
$$\frac{\partial n}{\partial t} = D \, \Delta n^m \, ,$$

where D is the diffusion coefficient, Φ is porosity, n is the concentration, m > 0 (usually m > 1, the case m = 1 corresponds to Fick's law).

Care must be taken to properly account for the porosity (Φ) of the porous medium in both the flux terms and the accumulation terms. For example, as the porosity goes to zero, the molar flux in the porous medium goes to zero for a given concentration gradient. Upon applying the divergence of the flux, the porosity terms cancel out and the second equation above is formed.

For diffusion of gases in porous media this equation is the formalization of Darcy's law: the volumetric flux of a gas in the porous media is

$$q=-\frac{k}{\mu}\,\nabla p$$

where k is the permeability of the medium, μ is the viscosity and p is the pressure.

The advective molar flux is given as

J = nq

and for $p \sim n^\gamma$ Darcy's law gives the equation of diffusion in porous media with m = γ + 1.

In porous media, the average linear velocity (ν), is related to the volumetric flux as:

$\upsilon= q/\phi$

Combining the advective molar flux with the diffusive flux gives the advection dispersion equation

$\frac{\partial n}{\partial t} = D \, \Delta n^m \ - \nu\cdot \nabla n^m,$

For underground water infiltration, the Boussinesq approximation gives the same equation with m = 2.

For plasma with the high level of radiation, the Zeldovich–Raizer equation gives m > 4 for the heat transfer.

== Diffusion in physics ==
=== Diffusion coefficient in kinetic theory of gases ===
Random collisions of particles in a gas.

The diffusion coefficient $D$ is the coefficient in the Fick's first law $J=- D \, \partial n/\partial x$, where J is the diffusion flux (amount of substance) per unit area per unit time, n (for ideal mixtures) is the concentration, x is the position [length].

Consider two gases with molecules of the same diameter d and mass m (self-diffusion). In this case, the elementary mean free path theory of diffusion gives for the diffusion coefficient

$$D=\frac{1}{3} \ell v_T = \frac{2}{3}\sqrt{\frac{k_{\rm B}^3}{\pi^3 m}} \frac{T^{3/2}}{Pd^2}\, ,$$

where k_{B} is the Boltzmann constant, T is the temperature, P is the pressure, $\ell$ is the mean free path, and v_{T} is the mean thermal speed:

$$\ell = \frac{k_{\rm B}T}{\sqrt 2 \pi d^2 P}\, , \;\;\; v_T=\sqrt{\frac{8k_{\rm B}T}{\pi m}}\, .$$

We can see that the diffusion coefficient in the mean free path approximation grows with T as T^{3/2} and decreases with P as 1/P. If we use for P the ideal gas law P = RnT with the total concentration n, then we can see that for given concentration n the diffusion coefficient grows with T as T^{1/2} and for given temperature it decreases with the total concentration as 1/n.

For two different gases, A and B, with molecular masses m_{A}, m_{B} and molecular diameters d_{A}, d_{B}, the mean free path estimate of the diffusion coefficient of A in B and B in A is:

$$D_{\rm AB}=\frac{2}{3}\sqrt{\frac{k_{\rm B}^3}{\pi^3}}\sqrt{\frac{1}{2m_{\rm A}}+\frac{1}{2m_{\rm B}}}\frac{4T^{3/2}}{P(d_{\rm A}+d_{\rm B})^2}\, ,$$

=== The theory of diffusion in gases based on Boltzmann's equation ===
In Boltzmann's kinetics of the mixture of gases, each gas has its own distribution function, $f_i(x,c,t)$, where t is the time moment, x is position and c is velocity of molecule of the ith component of the mixture. Each component has its mean velocity $C_i(x,t) = \frac{1}{n_i} \int_c c f(x,c,t) \, dc$. If the velocities $C_i(x,t)$ do not coincide then there exists diffusion.

In the Chapman–Enskog approximation, all the distribution functions are expressed through the densities of the conserved quantities:

- individual concentrations of particles, $n_i(x,t)=\int_c f_i(x,c,t)\, dc$ (particles per volume),
- density of momentum $\sum_i m_i n_i C_i(x,t)$ (m_{i} is the ith particle mass),
- density of kinetic energy
  $$\sum_i \left( n_i\frac{m_i C^2_i(x,t)}{2} + \int_c \frac{m_i (c_i-C_i(x,t))^2}{2} f_i(x,c,t)\, dc \right).$$

The kinetic temperature T and pressure P are defined in 3D space as

$$\frac{3}{2}k_{\rm B} T=\frac{1}{n} \int_c \frac{m_i (c_i-C_i(x,t))^2}{2} f_i(x,c,t)\, dc; \quad P=k_{\rm B}nT,$$

where $n=\sum_i n_i$ is the total density.

For two gases, the difference between velocities, $C_1-C_2$ is given by the expression:

$$C_1-C_2=-\frac{n^2}{n_1n_2}D_{12}\left\{ \nabla \left(\frac{n_1}{n} \right)+ \frac{n_1n_2 (m_2-m_1)}{P n (m_1n_1+ m_2n_2)} \nabla P- \frac{m_1 n_1 m_2 n_2}{P(m_1n_1+ m_2n_2)}(F_1-F_2)+k_T \frac{1}{T}\nabla T\right\},$$

where $F_i$ is the force applied to the molecules of the ith component and $k_T$ is the thermodiffusion ratio.

The coefficient D_{12} is positive. This is the diffusion coefficient. Four terms in the formula for C_{1}−C_{2} describe four main effects in the diffusion of gases:

1. $\nabla \,\left(\frac{n_1}{n}\right)$ describes the flux of the first component from the areas with the high ratio n_{1}/n to the areas with lower values of this ratio (and, analogously the flux of the second component from high n_{2}/n to low n_{2}/n because n_{2}/n = 1 – n_{1}/n);
2. $\frac{n_1n_2 (m_2-m_1)}{n (m_1n_1+m_2n_2)}\nabla P$ describes the flux of the heavier molecules to the areas with higher pressure and the lighter molecules to the areas with lower pressure, this is barodiffusion;
3. $\frac{m_1 n_1 m_2 n_2}{P(m_1 n_1+ m_2 n_2)}(F_1-F_2)$ describes diffusion caused by the difference of the forces applied to molecules of different types. For example, in the Earth's gravitational field, the heavier molecules should go down, or in electric field the charged molecules should move, until this effect is not equilibrated by the sum of other terms. This effect should not be confused with barodiffusion caused by the pressure gradient.
4. $k_T \frac{1}{T}\nabla T$ describes thermodiffusion, the diffusion flux caused by the temperature gradient.

All these effects are called diffusion because they describe the differences between velocities of different components in the mixture. Therefore, these effects cannot be described as a bulk transport and differ from advection or convection.

In the first approximation,

- $$D_{12}=\frac{3}{2n(d_1+d_2)^2}\left[\frac{kT(m_1+m_2)}{2\pi m_1m_2} \right]^{1/2}$$
  for rigid spheres;
- $$D_{12}=\frac{3}{8nA_1({\nu})\Gamma(3-\frac{2}{\nu-1})} \left[\frac{kT(m_1+m_2)}{2\pi m_1m_2}\right]^{1/2} \left(\frac{2kT}{\kappa_{12}} \right)^{\frac{2}{\nu-1}}$$
  for repulsing force $\kappa_{12}r^{-\nu}.$

The number $A_1({\nu})$ is defined by quadratures (formulas (3.7), (3.9), Ch. 10 of the classical Chapman and Cowling book)

We can see that the dependence on T for the rigid spheres is the same as for the simple mean free path theory but for the power repulsion laws the exponent is different. Dependence on a total concentration n for a given temperature has always the same character, 1/n.

In applications to gas dynamics, the diffusion flux and the bulk flow should be joined in one system of transport equations. The bulk flow describes the mass transfer. Its velocity V is the mass average velocity. It is defined through the momentum density and the mass concentrations:

$$V=\frac{\sum_i \rho_i C_i} \rho \, .$$

where $\rho_i =m_i n_i$ is the mass concentration of the ith species, $\rho=\sum_i \rho_i$ is the mass density.

By definition, the diffusion velocity of the ith component is $v_i=C_i-V$, $\sum_i \rho_i v_i=0$. The mass transfer of the ith component is described by the continuity equation

$$\frac{\partial \rho_i}{\partial t}+\nabla(\rho_i V) + \nabla (\rho_i v_i) = W_i \, ,$$

where $W_i$ is the net mass production rate in chemical reactions, $\sum_i W_i= 0$.

In these equations, the term $\nabla(\rho_i V)$ describes advection of the ith component and the term $\nabla (\rho_i v_i)$ represents diffusion of this component.

In 1948, Wendell H. Furry proposed to use the form of the diffusion rates found in kinetic theory as a framework for the new phenomenological approach to diffusion in gases. This approach was developed further by F.A. Williams and S.H. Lam. For the diffusion velocities in multicomponent gases (N components) they used

$$v_i=-\left(\sum_{j=1}^N D_{ij} \mathbf{d}_j + D_i^{(T)} \, \nabla (\ln T) \right)\, ;$$
$$\mathbf{d}_j=\nabla X_j + (X_j-Y_j)\,\nabla (\ln P) + \mathbf{g}_j\, ;$$
$$\mathbf{g}_j=\frac{\rho}{P} \left( Y_j \sum_{k=1}^N Y_k (f_k-f_j) \right)\, .$$

Here, $D_{ij}$ is the diffusion coefficient matrix, $D_i^{(T)}$ is the thermal diffusion coefficient, $f_i$ is the body force per unit mass acting on the ith species, $X_i=P_i/P$ is the partial pressure fraction of the ith species (and $P_i$ is the partial pressure), $Y_i=\rho_i/\rho$ is the mass fraction of the ith species, and $\sum_i X_i=\sum_i Y_i=1.$

As carriers are generated (green:electrons and purple:holes) due to light shining at the center of an intrinsic semiconductor, they diffuse towards two ends. Electrons have higher diffusion constant than holes leading to fewer excess electrons at the center as compared to holes.

=== Diffusion of electrons in solids ===
When the density of electrons in solids is not in equilibrium, diffusion of electrons occurs. For example, when a bias is applied to two ends of a chunk of semiconductor, or a light shines on one end (see right figure), electrons diffuse from high density regions (center) to low density regions (two ends), forming a gradient of electron density. This process generates current, referred to as diffusion current.

Diffusion current can also be described by Fick's first law

$$J=- D \, \partial n/\partial x\, ,$$

where J is the diffusion current density (amount of substance) per unit area per unit time, n (for ideal mixtures) is the electron density, x is the position [length].

=== Diffusion in geophysics ===
Analytical and numerical models that solve the diffusion equation for different initial and boundary conditions have been popular for studying a wide variety of changes to the Earth's surface. Diffusion has been used extensively in erosion studies of hillslope retreat, bluff erosion, fault scarp degradation, wave-cut terrace/shoreline retreat, alluvial channel incision, coastal shelf retreat, and delta progradation. Although the Earth's surface is not literally diffusing in many of these cases, the process of diffusion effectively mimics the holistic changes that occur over decades to millennia. Diffusion models may also be used to solve inverse boundary value problems in which some information about the depositional environment is known from paleoenvironmental reconstruction and the diffusion equation is used to figure out the sediment influx and time series of landform changes.

=== Dialysis ===
Schematic of semipermeable membrane during hemodialysis, where blood is red, dialysing fluid is blue, and the membrane is yellow.

Dialysis works on the principles of the diffusion of solutes and ultrafiltration of fluid across a semi-permeable membrane. Diffusion is a property of substances in water; substances in water tend to move from an area of high concentration to an area of low concentration. Blood flows by one side of a semi-permeable membrane, and a dialysate, or special dialysis fluid, flows by the opposite side. A semipermeable membrane is a thin layer of material that contains holes of various sizes, or pores. Smaller solutes and fluid pass through the membrane, but the membrane blocks the passage of larger substances (for example, red blood cells and large proteins). This replicates the filtering process that takes place in the kidneys when the blood enters the kidneys and the larger substances are separated from the smaller ones in the glomerulus.

== Random walk (random motion) ==
The apparent random motion of atoms, ions or molecules explained. Substances appear to move randomly due to collisions with other substances. From the iBook Cell Membrane Transport, free license granted by IS3D, LLC, 2014.

One common misconception is that individual atoms, ions or molecules move randomly, which they do not. In the animation on the right, the ion in the left panel appears to have "random" motion in the absence of other ions. As the right panel shows, however, this motion is not random but is the result of "collisions" with other ions. As such, the movement of a single atom, ion, or molecule within a mixture just appears random when viewed in isolation. The movement of a substance within a mixture by "random walk" is governed by the kinetic energy within the system that can be affected by changes in concentration, pressure or temperature. (This is a classical description. At smaller scales, quantum effects will be non-negligible, in general. Thus, the study of the movement of a single atom becomes more subtle since particles at such small scales are described by probability amplitudes rather than deterministic measures of position and velocity.)

=== Separation of diffusion from convection in gases ===
While Brownian motion of multi-molecular mesoscopic particles (like pollen grains studied by Brown) is observable under an optical microscope, molecular diffusion can only be probed in carefully controlled experimental conditions. Since Graham experiments, it is well known that avoiding of convection is necessary and this may be a non-trivial task.

Under normal conditions, molecular diffusion dominates only at lengths in the nanometre-to-millimetre range. On larger length scales, transport in liquids and gases is normally due to another transport phenomenon, convection. To separate diffusion in these cases, special efforts are needed.

In contrast, heat conduction through solid media is an everyday occurrence (for example, a metal spoon partly immersed in a hot liquid). This explains why the diffusion of heat was explained mathematically before the diffusion of mass.

=== Other types of diffusion ===
- Anisotropic diffusion, also known as the Perona–Malik equation, enhances high gradients
- Atomic diffusion, in solids
- Bohm diffusion, spread of plasma across magnetic fields
- Eddy diffusion, in coarse-grained description of turbulent flow
- Effusion of a gas through small holes
- Electronic diffusion, resulting in an electric current called the diffusion current
- Facilitated diffusion, present in some organisms
- Functional-diffusion, recently introduced diffusion on the function of an observable, in the context of Anomalous diffusion.
- Gaseous diffusion, used for isotope separation
- Heat equation, diffusion of thermal energy
- Itō diffusion, mathematisation of Brownian motion, continuous stochastic process.
- Knudsen diffusion of gas in long pores with frequent wall collisions
- Lévy flight
- Molecular diffusion, diffusion of molecules from more dense to less dense areas
- Momentum diffusion ex. the diffusion of the hydrodynamic velocity field
- Photon diffusion
- Plasma diffusion
- Random walk, model for diffusion
- Reverse diffusion, against the concentration gradient, in phase separation
- Rotational diffusion, random reorientation of molecules
- Spin diffusion, diffusion of spin magnetic moments in solids
- Surface diffusion, diffusion of adparticles on a surface
- Taxis is an animal's directional movement activity in response to a stimulus
  - Kinesis is an animal's non-directional movement activity in response to a stimulus
- Trans-cultural diffusion, diffusion of cultural traits across geographical area
- Turbulent diffusion, transport of mass, heat, or momentum within a turbulent fluid

== See also ==
- Anomalous diffusion – Diffusion process with a non-linear relationship to time
- Convection–diffusion equation – Combination of the diffusion and convection (advection) equations
- Diffusion-limited aggregation – Process of particles clustering together
- Darken's equations
- Isobaric counterdiffusion – Gaseous diffusion through body tissue at constant total pressure
- Sorption – Physical or chemical process by which one substance becomes attached to another
- Osmosis – Movement of molecules to lower concentration
- Percolation theory – Mathematical theory on behavior of connected clusters in a random graph
- Social Networks
