= Diffuser =

Diffuser may refer to:

== Aerodynamics ==
- Diffuser (automotive), a shaped section of a car's underbody which improves the car's aerodynamic properties
- Part of a jet engine air intake, especially when operated at supersonic speeds
- The channel between the vanes of the stator of a centrifugal compressor

== Other uses ==
- Sound diffuser, a device that scatters reflections of sound across frequencies
- Diffuser (band), a punk rock band from New York, U.S.
- Diffuser (breathing set part), a device fitted over an underwater breathing set's exhaust orifice to break up the gas outflow
- Diffuser (hair), a blowdryer attachment that diffuses heat as it dries the hair
- Diffuser (heat), a cooking item that is placed above a heating element to separate the cooking utensil from the heat source
- Diffuser (optics), a device that spreads out or scatters light
- Diffuser (sewage), an aerating device for sewage and industrial waste water treatments
- Diffuser (thermodynamics), a device that controls the characteristics of a fluid at the entrance to a thermodynamic open system
- Aroma lamp (sometimes called an aromatherapy diffuser or reed diffuser), used to disperse essential oils into the surroundings
- Diffuser (website), website by Townsquare Media

== See also ==
- Diffusion (disambiguation)
