= Momentum diffusion =

Momentum diffusion most commonly refers to the diffusion, or spread of momentum between particles (atoms or molecules) of matter, often in the fluid state. This transport of momentum can occur in any direction of the fluid flow. Momentum diffusion can be attributed to either external pressure or shear stress or both.

== Diffusion due to pressure ==
When pressure is applied on an incompressible fluid the velocity of the fluid will change. The fluid accelerates or decelerates depending on the relative direction of pressure with respect to the flow direction. This is because applying pressure on the fluid has caused momentum diffusion in that direction. Understanding the exact nature of diffusion is a key aspect toward understanding momentum diffusion due to pressure.

== Momentum diffusion due to shear stresses ==
A fluid flowing along a flat plate will stick to it at the point of contact and this is known as the no-slip condition. This is an outcome of the adhesive forces between the flat plate and the fluid. The presence of the wall has an effect up to a certain distance in the fluid (in the direction perpendicular to the wall area and flow ) and this is known as the boundary layer.

Any layer of fluid that is not in contact with the wall will be flowing with a certain velocity and will be sandwiched between two layers of fluid. Now the layer just above it (flowing with a greater velocity) will try to drag it in the direction of flow, whereas the layer just below it (flowing with a lesser velocity) will try to slow it down. The attraction between the layers of the fluid is the result of cohesive forces, and viscosity is the property that explains the nature and strength of cohesive forces within a fluid.

It is common to experience the fact that the flowing fluid will exert a certain amount of force on the plate, trying to pull it in its flow direction. The flat plate exerts an equal amount of force on the fluid. (Newton's third law)

Experiments on the fluid flow parallel to a flat plate reveal that the force, known as shear stress can be expressed mathematically as

$$\tau = -\mu \frac{du}{dy}$$

Note this is valid only for one dimensional fluid flow in rectangular coordinates. The $\tau$ is the shear stress at any layer of the fluid where $du/dy$ (i.e. the gradient of velocity in a direction perpendicular to the flow and the area of the flat plate), is the local gradient and $\mu$ is the viscosity.

The units of shear stress are Force/Unit Area. This is $N/m^2$ in M.K.S system. This can also be interpreted as $kg/m{\cdot}s^2$. However, these are also the units of momentum flux. This is the precise reason why shear stress in a fluid can also be interpreted as the flux of momentum. The diffusion of momentum is in the direction of decreasing velocity. This means that momentum is being transferred from the fluid in the upper layers (which has greater momentum) toward the fluid that is close to the wall (which has lesser momentum due to its lower velocity).

The phrase "momentum diffusion" can also refer to the diffusion of the probability for a single particle to have a particular momentum. In this case, it is the probability distribution function that diffuses in momentum space, rather than the (conserved) quantity of momentum that diffuses among many particles.
