= Reverse diffusion =

Reverse diffusion refers to a situation where the transport of particles (atoms or molecules) in a medium occurs towards regions of higher concentration gradients, opposite to that observed during diffusion. This phenomenon occurs during phase separation and is described by the Cahn–Hilliard equation. Reverse diffusion also refers to when water is forced from a region of lower concentration to high. It can occur in osmosis.
