= Tortuosity =

Parameter for diffusion and fluid flow in porous media

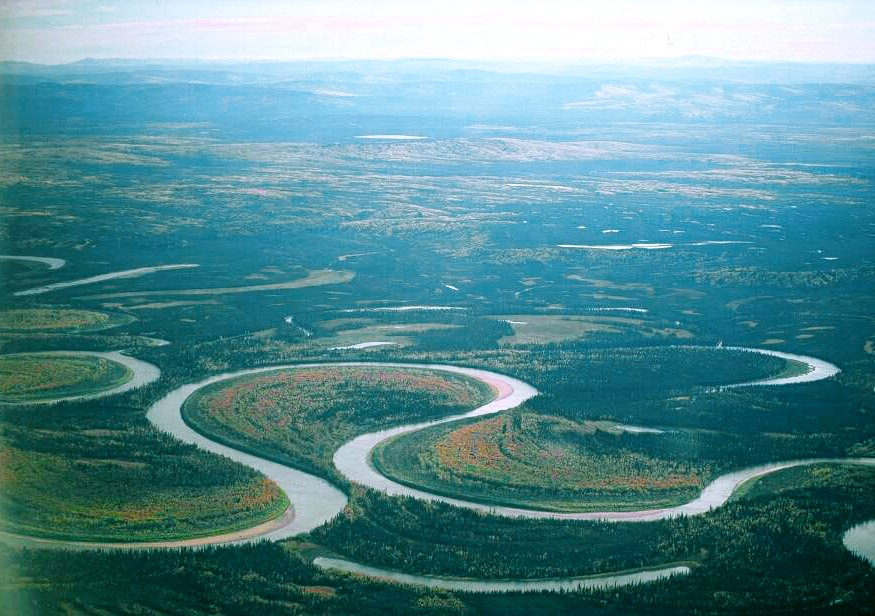
A tortuous river (meander of Nowitna River, Alaska)

Tortuosity is widely used as a critical parameter to predict transport properties of porous media, such as rocks and soils. But unlike other standard microstructural properties, the concept of tortuosity is vague with multiple definitions and various evaluation methods introduced in different contexts. Hydraulic, electrical, diffusional, and thermal tortuosities are defined to describe different transport processes in porous media, while geometrical tortuosity is introduced to characterize the morphological property of porous microstructures.

== Tortuosity in 2-D ==
Subjective estimation (sometimes aided by optometric grading scales) is often used.

The simplest mathematical method to estimate tortuosity is the arc-chord ratio: the ratio of the length of the curve (C) to the distance between its ends (L):

$$\tau  = \frac{C}{L}$$

Arc-chord ratio equals 1 for a straight line and is infinite for a circle.

Another method, proposed in 1999, is to estimate the tortuosity as the integral of the square (or module) of the curvature. Dividing the result by length of curve or chord has also been tried.

In 2002 several Italian scientists proposed one more method. At first, the curve is divided into several (N) parts with constant sign of curvature (using hysteresis to decrease sensitivity to noise). Then the arc-chord ratio for each part is found and the tortuosity is estimated by:

$$\tau  = \frac{{N - 1}}{L} \cdot \sum\limits_{i = 1}^N {\left( {\frac{{L_i }}{{S_i }} - 1} \right)}$$

In this case tortuosity of both straight line and circle is estimated to be 0.

In 1993 Swiss mathematician Martin Mächler proposed an analogy: it is relatively easy to drive a bicycle or a car in a trajectory with a constant curvature (an arc of a circle), but it is much harder to drive where curvature changes. This would imply that roughness (or tortuosity) could be measured by relative change of curvature. In this case the proposed "local" measure was derivative of logarithm of curvature:

$$\frac{d}{{dx}}\log \left( \kappa \right) = \frac{{\kappa'}}{\kappa}$$

However, in this case tortuosity of a straight line is left undefined.

In 2005 it was proposed to measure tortuosity by an integral of square of derivative of curvature, divided by the length of a curve:

$$\tau  = \frac{{\int\limits_{t_1 }^{t_2 } {\left( {\kappa'\left( t \right)} \right)^2 } dt}}{L}$$

In this case tortuosity of both straight line and circle is estimated to be 0.

Fractal dimension has been used to quantify tortuosity. The fractal dimension in 2D for a straight line is 1 (the minimal value), and ranges up to 2 for a plane-filling curve or Brownian motion.

In most of these methods digital filters and approximation by splines can be used to decrease sensitivity to noise.

A stereoloical method is developed in 2D case to quantify the impacts of particle shape, area fraction, and orientation on the geometric tortuosity. Their study indicates that the particle size distribution and spatial arrange has no impact on the geometric tortuosity.

== Tortuosity in 3-D ==
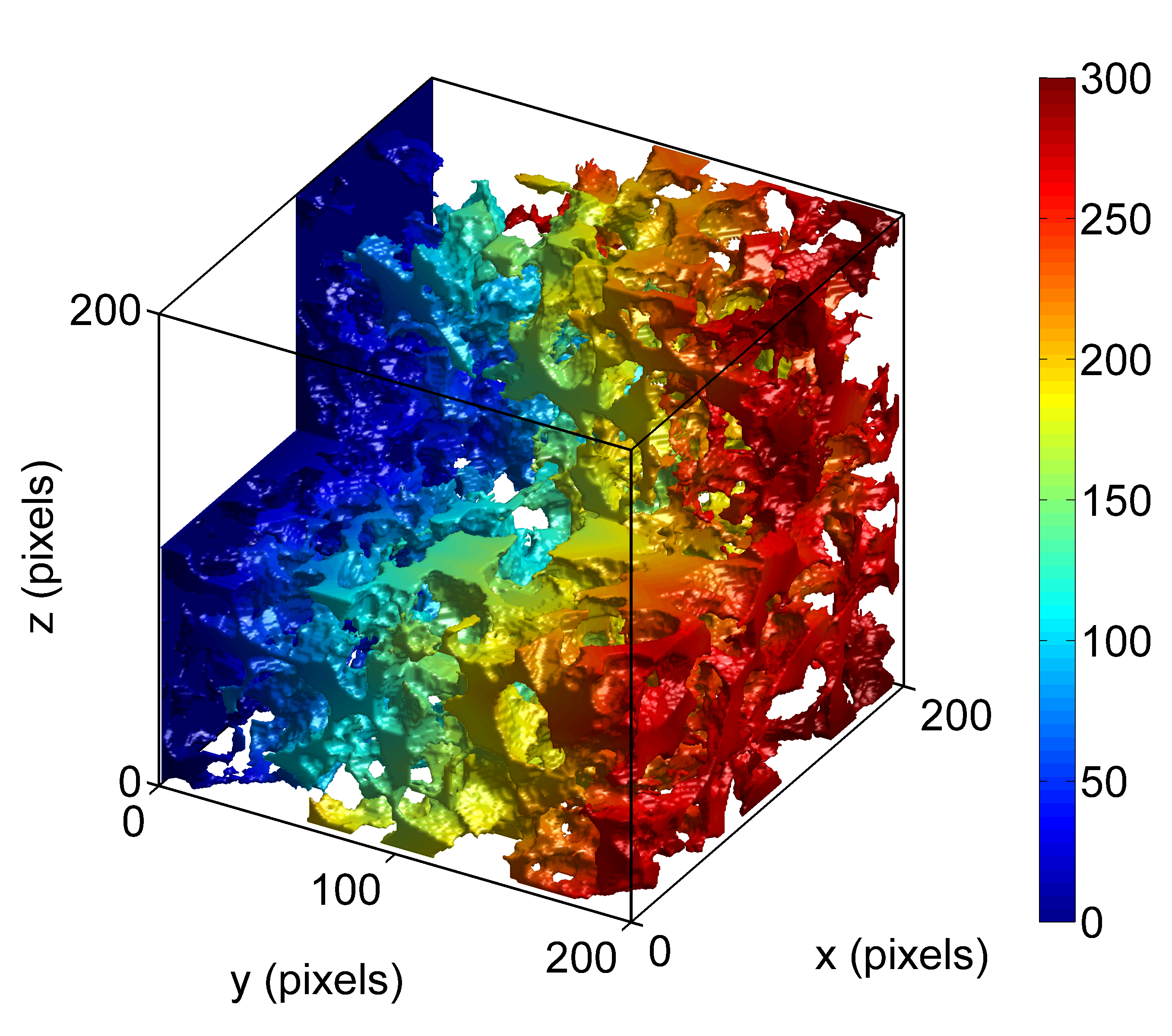
Tortuosity calculation from an x-ray tomography reconstruction of a porous sandstone (the pores are shown): the color represents the shortest distance within the pore space from the left limit of the image to any point in the pores. Comparing this distance to the straight-line distance shows that the tortuosity is about 1.5 for this sample. It has been demonstrated that the tortuosity increases when the porosity decreases.

Usually subjective estimation is used. However, several ways to adapt methods estimating tortuosity in 2-D have also been tried. The methods include arc-chord ratio, arc-chord ratio divided by number of inflection points and integral of square of curvature, divided by length of the curve (curvature is estimated assuming that small segments of curve are planar). Another method used for quantifying tortuosity in 3D has been applied in 3D reconstructions of solid oxide fuel cell cathodes where the Euclidean distance sums of the centroids of a pore were divided by the length of the pore.

A stereological approach is employed to investigate the particle shape, size distribution, volume fraction on the geometirc tortuosity of cracking path. An approximate formula is developed to quantify the impacts of particle shape and volumef fraction on the geometric tortuosity. It is also found that both size distribution and spatial arrangement of particles has no effect on the geometric tortuosity. The impact of chemical reaction on tortuosity of pore is also concerned.

== Applications of tortuosity ==
Tortuosity of blood vessels (for example, retinal and cerebral blood vessels) is known to be used as a medical sign.

In mathematics, cubic splines minimize the functional, equivalent to integral of square of curvature (approximating the curvature as the second derivative).

In many engineering domains dealing with mass transfer in porous materials, such as hydrogeology or heterogeneous catalysis, the tortuosity refers to the ratio of the diffusivity in the free space to the diffusivity in the porous medium (analogous to arc-chord ratio of path). Strictly speaking, however, the effective diffusivity is proportional to the reciprocal of the square of the geometrical tortuosity

Because of the porous materials found in several layers of fuel cells, the tortuosity is an important variable to be analyzed. It is important to notice that there are different kind of tortuosity, i.e., gas-phase, ionic and electronic tortuosity.

In acoustics and following initial works by Maurice Anthony Biot in 1956, the tortuosity is used to describe sound propagation in fluid-saturated porous media. In such media, when frequency of the sound wave is high enough, the effect of viscous drag force between the solid and the fluid can be ignored. In this case, velocity of sound propagation in the fluid in the pores is non-dispersive and compared with the value of the velocity of sound in the free fluid is reduced by a ratio equal to the square root of the tortuosity. This has been used for a number of applications including the study of materials for acoustic isolation, and for oil prospection using acoustics means.

In analytical chemistry applied to polymers and sometimes small molecules tortuosity is applied in gel permeation chromatography (GPC) also known as size exclusion chromatography (SEC). As with any chromatography it is used to separate mixtures. In the case of GPC the separation is based on molecular size and it works by the use of stationary media with an appropriate porous microstructure and adequate pore dimensions and distribution. The separation occurs because larger molecules cannot enter the smaller porosity for steric hindrance reasons (constrictivity of the narrow pores) and remain in the macropores, eluting more quickly, while smaller molecules can pass into smaller pores and take a longer, more tortuous path and elute later.

In pharmaceutical sciences, tortuosity is used in relation to diffusion-controlled release from solid dosage forms. Insoluble matrix formers, such as ethyl cellulose, certain vinyl polymers, starch acetate and others control the permeation of the drug from the preparation and into the surrounding liquid. The rate of mass transfer per area unit is, among other factors, related to the shape of polymeric chains within the dosage form. Higher tortuosity or curviness retards mass transfer as it acts obstructively on the drug particles within the formulation.

HVAC makes extensive use of tortuosity in evaporator and condenser coils for heat exchangers, whereas Ultra-high vacuum makes use of the inverse of tortuosity, which is conductivity, with short, straight, voluminous paths.

Tortuosity has been used in ecology to describe the movement paths of animals.
