= Mass diffusivity =

Proportionality constant in some physical laws

Diffusivity, mass diffusivity or diffusion coefficient is usually written as the proportionality constant between the molar flux due to molecular diffusion and the negative value of the gradient in the concentration of the species. More accurately, the diffusion coefficient times the local concentration is the proportionality constant between the negative value of the mole fraction gradient and the molar flux. This distinction is especially significant in gaseous systems with strong temperature gradients. Diffusivity derives its definition from Fick's law and plays a role in numerous other equations of physical chemistry.

The diffusivity is generally prescribed for a given pair of species and pairwise for a multi-species system. The higher the diffusivity (of one substance with respect to another), the faster they diffuse into each other. Typically, a compound's diffusion coefficient is ~10,000× as great in air as in water. Carbon dioxide in air has a diffusion coefficient of 16 mm^{2}/s, and in water its diffusion coefficient is 0.0016 mm^{2}/s.

Diffusivity has dimensions of length^{2} / time, or m^{2}/s in SI units and cm^{2}/s in CGS units.

== Temperature dependence of the diffusion coefficient ==
=== Solids ===
The diffusion coefficient in solids at different temperatures is generally found to be well predicted by the Arrhenius equation:

$$D = D_0 \exp\left(-\frac{E_\text{A}}{RT}\right)$$

where

- D is the diffusion coefficient (in m^{2}/s),
- D_{0} is the maximal diffusion coefficient (at infinite temperature; in m^{2}/s),
- E_{A} is the activation energy for diffusion (in J/mol),
- T is the absolute temperature (in K),
- R ≈ 8.31446 J/(mol⋅K) is the universal gas constant.

Diffusion in crystalline solids, termed lattice diffusion, is commonly regarded to occur by two distinct mechanisms, interstitial and substitutional or vacancy diffusion. The former mechanism describes diffusion as the motion of the diffusing atoms between interstitial sites in the lattice of the solid it is diffusing into, the latter describes diffusion through a mechanism more analogue to that in liquids or gases: Any crystal at nonzero temperature will have a certain number of vacancy defects (i.e. empty sites on the lattice) due to the random vibrations of atoms on the lattice, an atom neighbouring a vacancy can spontaneously "jump" into the vacancy, such that the vacancy appears to move. By this process the atoms in the solid can move, and diffuse into each other. Of the two mechanisms, interstitial diffusion is typically more rapid.

=== Liquids ===
An approximate dependence of the diffusion coefficient on temperature in liquids can often be found using Stokes–Einstein equation, which predicts that

$$\frac {D_{T_1}} {D_{T_2}} = \frac {T_1} {T_2} \frac {\mu_{T_2}} {\mu_{T_1}},$$

where

- D is the diffusion coefficient,
- T_{1} and T_{2} are the corresponding absolute temperatures,
- μ is the dynamic viscosity of the solvent.

The description of diffusion coefficients in liquid mixtures is more difficult. They can be, for example, modeled using entropy scaling.

=== Gases ===
The dependence of the diffusion coefficient on temperature for gases can be expressed using Chapman–Enskog theory (predictions accurate on average to about 8%):

$$D = \frac{A T^\frac{3}{2}}{p\sigma_{12}^{2}\Omega}\sqrt{\frac{1}{M_1} + \frac{1}{M_2}},$$
$$A = \frac{3}{8} k_b^\frac{3}{2} \sqrt{\frac{N_A}{2\pi}}$$

where

- D is the diffusion coefficient (cm^{2}/s),
- A is approximately $1.859 \times 10^{-3} \mathrm{\frac{atm \cdot \AA^2 \cdot {cm}^2}{K^{3/2} \cdot s} \sqrt{\frac{g}{mol}}}$ (with Boltzmann constant $k_b$, and Avogadro constant $N_A$)
- 1 and 2 index the two kinds of molecules present in the gaseous mixture,
- T is the absolute temperature (K),
- M is the molar mass (g/mol),
- p is the pressure (atm),
- $\sigma_{12} = \frac{1}{2}(\sigma_1 + \sigma_2)$ is the average collision diameter (the values are tabulated page 545) (Å),
- Ω is a temperature-dependent collision integral (the values tabulated for some intermolecular potentials, can be computed from correlations for others, or must be evaluated numerically.) (dimensionless).

The relation

$$D \sim \frac{T^{3/2}}{p \Omega(T)}$$

is obtained when inserting the ideal gas law into the expression obtained directly from Chapman-Enskog theory, which may be written as

$$D = D_0 \frac{T^{1/2}}{n \Omega(T)}$$

where $n$ is the molar density (mol / m^{3}) of the gas, and

$$D_0 = \frac{3 }{8 \sigma_{12} ^2 } \sqrt{\left(\frac{R}{2 \pi}\right)\left(\frac{1}{M_1} + \frac{1}{M_2}\right)},$$

with $R = k_B N_A$ the universal gas constant. At moderate densities (i.e. densities at which the gas has a non-negligible co-volume, but is still sufficiently dilute to be considered as gas-like rather than liquid-like) this simple relation no longer holds, and one must resort to Revised Enskog Theory. Revised Enskog Theory predicts a diffusion coefficient that decreases somewhat more rapidly with density, and which to a first approximation may be written as

$$D = D_0 \frac{T^{1/2}}{n g(\sigma) \Omega(T)}$$

where $g(\sigma)$ is the radial distribution function evaluated at the contact diameter of the particles. For molecules behaving like hard, elastic spheres, this value can be computed from the Carnahan-Starling Equation, while for more realistic intermolecular potentials such as the Mie potential or Lennard-Jones potential, its computation is more complex, and may involve invoking a thermodynamic perturbation theory, such as SAFT.

== Pressure dependence of the diffusion coefficient ==
For self-diffusion in gases at two different pressures (but the same temperature), the following empirical equation has been suggested:
$$\frac {D_{P1}} {D_{P2}} = \frac {\rho_{P2}} {\rho_{P1}},$$
where

- D is the diffusion coefficient,
- ρ is the gas mass density,
- P_{1} and P_{2} are the corresponding pressures.

== Population dynamics: dependence of the diffusion coefficient on fitness ==
In population dynamics, kinesis is the change of the diffusion coefficient in response to the change of conditions. In models of purposeful kinesis, diffusion coefficient depends on fitness (or reproduction coefficient) r:
$$D = D_0 e ^{-\alpha r},$$

where $D_0$ is constant and r depends on population densities and abiotic characteristics of the living conditions. This dependence is a formalisation of the simple rule: Animals stay longer in good conditions and leave quicker bad conditions (the "Let well enough alone" model).

== Effective diffusivity in porous media ==
The effective diffusion coefficient describes diffusion through the pore space of porous media. It is macroscopic in nature, because it is not individual pores but the entire pore space that needs to be considered. The effective diffusion coefficient for transport through the pores, D_{e}, is estimated as follows:
$$D_\text{e} = \frac{D\varepsilon_t \delta}{\tau},$$
where

- D is the diffusion coefficient in gas or liquid filling the pores,
- ε_{t} is the porosity available for the transport (dimensionless),
- δ is the constrictivity (dimensionless),
- τ is the tortuosity (dimensionless).

The transport-available porosity equals the total porosity less the pores which, due to their size, are not accessible to the diffusing particles, and less dead-end and blind pores (i.e., pores without being connected to the rest of the pore system). The constrictivity describes the slowing down of diffusion by increasing the viscosity in narrow pores as a result of greater proximity to the average pore wall. It is a function of pore diameter and the size of the diffusing particles.

== Example values ==
Gases at 1 atm., solutes in liquid at infinite dilution. Legend: (s) – solid; (l) – liquid; (g) – gas; (dis) – dissolved.

Values of diffusion coefficients (gas)
Species pair		Temperature (°C)	D (cm^{2}/s)
Solute	Solvent	Temperature (°C)	D (cm^{2}/s)
H_{2}O (g)	Air (g)	25	0.260
NH_{3} (g)	Air (g)	25	0.280
CO_{2} (g)	Air (g)	25	0.160
O_{2}(g)	Air (g)	25	0.210
H_{2}(g)	Air (g)	25	0.410

Values of diffusion coefficients (liquid)
Species pair		Temperature (°C)	D (10^{−5} cm^{2}/s)
Solute	Solvent	Temperature (°C)	D (10^{−5} cm^{2}/s)
Acetone (dis)	Water (l)	25	1.16
Air (dis)	Water (l)	25	2.00
Ammonia (dis)	Water (l)	25	1.64
Argon (dis)	Water (l)	25	2.00
Benzene (dis)	Water (l)	25	1.02
Bromine (dis)	Water (l)	25	1.18
Carbon monoxide (dis)	Water (l)	25	2.03
Carbon dioxide (dis)	Water (l)	25	1.92
Chlorine (dis)	Water (l)	25	1.25
Ethane (dis)	Water (l)	25	1.20
Ethanol (dis)	Water (l)	25	0.84
Ethylene (dis)	Water (l)	25	1.87
Helium (dis)	Water (l)	25	6.28
Hydrogen (dis)	Water (l)	25	4.50
Hydrogen sulfide (dis)	Water (l)	25	1.41
Methane (dis)	Water (l)	25	1.49
Methanol (dis)	Water (l)	25	0.84
Nitrogen (dis)	Water (l)	25	1.88
Nitric oxide (dis)	Water (l)	25	2.60
Oxygen (dis)	Water (l)	25	2.10
Propane (dis)	Water (l)	25	0.97
Water (l)	Acetone (l)	25	4.56
Water (l)	Ethyl alcohol (l)	25	1.24
Water (l)	Ethyl acetate (l)	25	3.20

Values of diffusion coefficients (solid)
Species pair		Temperature (°C)	D (cm^{2}/s)
Solute	Solvent	Temperature (°C)	D (cm^{2}/s)
Hydrogen	Iron (s)	10	1.66×10^{−9}
Hydrogen	Iron (s)	100	124×10^{−9}
Aluminium	Copper (s)	20	1.3×10^{−30}

== See also ==
- Atomic diffusion
- Effective diffusion coefficient
- Lattice diffusion coefficient
- Knudsen diffusion
