= Self-diffusion =

Mass diffusivity of a chemical species without a chemical potential gradient

Self-diffusion describes the diffusive motions of molecules within themselves e.g. the movement of a water molecule in water. According to the IUPAC definition, the self-diffusion coefficient $D_i^*$ of medium $i$ is the diffusion coefficient $D_i$ of a chemical species in said medium when the concentration of this species is extrapolated to zero concentration. It can be described by the equation:

$$D_i^* = D_i\frac{\partial\ln c_i}{\partial\ln a_i}$$

Here, $a_i$ is the activity of the medium $i$ (e.g. water) in the system (e.g. solution) and $c_i$ is the concentration of medium $i$. Due to challenges observing it directly it is commonly assumed to be equal to the diffusion of an isotopically different molecule of the medium in the medium of interest e.g. a molecule of deuterated water in water. However modern simulations are able to estimate it directly without the need for isotope labeling.

== See also ==
- Brownian motion
- Diffusion
- Molecular diffusion
