= Knudsen gas =

A Knudsen gas is a gas in a state of such low density that the average distance travelled by the gas molecules between collisions (mean free path) is greater than the diameter of the receptacle that contains it. If the mean free path is much greater than the diameter, the flow regime is dominated by collisions between the gas molecules and the walls of the receptacle, rather than intermolecular collisions with each other. It is named after Martin Knudsen.

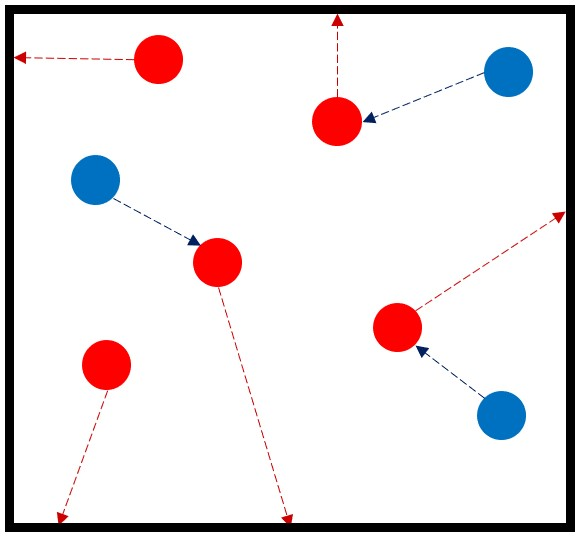
An example of a Knudsen gas. There are more collisions between the gas molecules and the receptacle walls (shown in red) compared to collisions between gas molecules (shown in blue).

== Knudsen number ==
For a Knudsen gas, the Knudsen number must be greater than 1. The Knudsen number can be defined as:

$\rm{Kn} = \frac{\lambda}{L}$

where

$\lambda$ is the mean free path [m]

$L$ is the diameter of the receptacle [m].

When $10^{-1}<\rm{Kn}<10$, the flow regime of the gas is transitional flow. In this regime the intermolecular collisions between gas particles are not yet negligible compared to collisions with the wall. However when $\rm{Kn}>10$, the flow regime is free molecular flow, so the intermolecular collisions between the particles are negligible compared to the collisions with the wall.

== Example ==
For example, consider a receptacle of air at room temperature and pressure with a mean free path of 68nm. If the diameter of the receptacle is less than 68nm, the Knudsen number would greater than 1, and this sample of air would be considered a Knudsen gas. It would not be a Knudsen gas if the diameter of the receptacle is greater than 68nm.

== See also ==
- Free streaming
- Kinetic theory
