= Klinkenberg correction =

In Petrophysics a Klinkenberg correction is a procedure for calibration of permeability data obtained from a minipermeameter device. A more accurate correction factor can be obtained using Knudsen correction. When using nitrogen gas for core plug measurements, the Klinkenberg correction is usually necessary due to the so-called Klinkenberg gas slippage effect. This takes place when the pore space approaches the mean free path of the gas.

== Theory ==
Under steady state and laminar flow condition, Klinkenberg demonstrated that the permeability of porous media to gases is approximately a linear function of the reciprocal pressure.

When Klinkenberg defined the interactions to be considered, he supposed the existence of a layer (sometimes called Knudsen layer), thinner than molecular mean free path, adjacent to the pore's wall where only molecules-wall collisions would occur and collisions among molecules could be ignored. Thus the slippage velocity, as obtained from the Klinkenberg's approach, captures the contribution of molecule-wall interactions and when this velocity is zero, the Poiseuille velocity profile (which results from molecule-molecule interactions) is recovered. However, Klinkenberg's formulation ignores the transition flow region, where neither molecule-molecule nor molecule-wall interactions can be neglected because both are playing a relevant role. The feasibility of Klinkenberg linear function of the reciprocal pressure depends on the Knudsen number. For Knudsen numbers from 0.01 to 0.1 the Klinkenberg approach is acceptable.

== Application ==
Permeability is measured in the laboratory by encasing a core plug of known length and diameter in an air-tight sleeve (the Hassler Sleeve). A fluid of known viscosity is injected into the core plug while mounted in a steel chamber. The samples are either full diameter core samples that are intervals of whole core cut, typically 6 inches long, or 1-in plugs drilled from the cores. The pressure drop across the sample and the flow rate are measured and permeability is calculated using Darcy's law.

Normally, either nitrogen or brine can be used as a fluid. When high rates of flow can be maintained, the results are comparable. At low rates, air permeability will be higher than brine permeability. This is because gas does not adhere to the pore walls as liquid does, and the slippage of gases along the pore walls gives rise to an apparent dependence of permeability on pressure. This is called the Klinkenberg effect, and it is especially important in low-permeable rocks.

In probe permeametry (mini-permeameter) measurement nitrogen gas is injected from the probe into core through a probe sealed to a core slab by a gasket. The gas flows from the end of a small-diameter tube that is sealed against the core surface. The pressure in the probe and the corresponding volumetric gas flow rate is measured together. The gas permeability is determined by the equation:

$$K_g = C q_1 \mu_g \frac{P_1}{a} G (P_1^2 - P_2^2)^2$$

Where,

$K_g$: Gas permeability
$q_1$: Flow rate
$P_1$: Injection pressure
$P_2$: Atmospheric pressure
$\mu_g$: Gas viscosity
$a$: Internal radius of tip seal
$G$: Geometric factor (halfspace solution)
$C$: Constant (unit conversion)

Obviously what can be obtained from minipermeameter measurement is gas permeability. Gas slippage will occur during the measurement because nitrogen is injected quickly from probe to core and it is very difficult to get to equilibrium in very short time span. Therefore, to get the permeability equivalent to the brine permeability at formation condition Klinkenberg calibration is necessary.
