= Martin Knudsen =

Danish physicist

- Born: 15 February 1871; Hasmark, Otterup
- Died: 27 May 1949 (aged 78); Copenhagen
- Known for: Knudsen cell Knudsen flow Knudsen diffusion Knudsen equation Knudsen force Knudsen number Knudsen gas Knudsen layer Knudsen absolute manometer Knudsen paradox Knudsen pump Hertz–Knudsen equation
- Awards: Alexander Agassiz Medal (1936); Ørsted Medal (1916)

Martin Hans Christian Knudsen (15 February 1871 in Hasmark on Funen – 27 May 1949 in Copenhagen) was a Danish physicist who taught and conducted research at the Technical University of Denmark.

He is primarily known for his study of molecular gas flow and the development of the Knudsen cell, which is a primary component of molecular beam epitaxy systems.

Knudsen received the university's gold medal in 1895 and earned his master's degree in physics the following year. He became lecturer in physics at the university in 1901 and professor in 1912, when Christian Christiansen (1843–1917) retired. He held this post until his own retirement in 1941.

Knudsen was renowned for his work on kinetic-molecular theory and low-pressure phenomena in gases. His name is associated with the Knudsen flow, Knudsen diffusion, Knudsen number, Knudsen layer and Knudsen gases. Also there is the Knudsen equation; two instruments, the Knudsen absolute manometer and Knudsen gauge; and one gas pump that operates without moving parts, the Knudsen pump. His book, The Kinetic Theory of Gases (London, 1934), contains the main results of his research.

Knudsen was also very active in physical oceanography, developing methods of defining properties of seawater. He participated as hydrographer on the Ingolf expedition in the North Atlantic in 1895-96. By means of his for the purpose constructed precision thermometer, capable of measuring water temperature in the deep sea with a precision of 1/100°C, it was demonstrated that the water masses at the sea floor north of the Wyville Thompson Ridge were consistently a few degrees colder than south of the ridge and likely explained the differences in the deep sea fauna on either sides of the ridge. He was editor of Hydrological Tables (Copenhagen–London, 1901). In 1927, he was one of the participants of the fifth Solvay Conference on Physics that took place at the International Solvay Institute for Physics in Belgium.

He was awarded the Alexander Agassiz Medal of the U.S. National Academy of Sciences in 1936. He was made a Commander First Class of the Order of the Dannebrog.
