= Knudsen diffusion =

Particle behavior in systems of length less than the mean free path

Schematic drawing of a molecule in a cylindrical pore in the case of Knudsen diffusion; are indicated the pore diameter (d) and the free path of the particle (l).

Knudsen diffusion, named after Martin Knudsen, is a means of diffusion that occurs when the scale length of a system is comparable to or smaller than the mean free path of the particles involved. An example of this is in a long pore with a narrow diameter (2–50 nm) because molecules frequently collide with the pore wall. As another example, consider the diffusion of gas molecules through very small capillary pores. If the pore diameter is smaller than the mean free path of the diffusing gas molecules, and the density of the gas is low, the gas molecules collide with the pore walls more frequently than with each other, leading to Knudsen diffusion.

In fluid mechanics, the Knudsen number is a good measure of the relative importance of Knudsen diffusion. A Knudsen number much greater than one indicates Knudsen diffusion is important. In practice, Knudsen diffusion applies only to gases because the mean free path for molecules in the liquid state is very small, typically near the diameter of the molecule itself.

== Mathematical description ==
The diffusivity for Knudsen diffusion is obtained from the self-diffusion coefficient derived from the kinetic theory of gases:

$${D_{AA*}} = {{\lambda u} \over {3}} = {{\lambda}\over{3}} \sqrt{{8R T}\over {\pi M_{A}}}$$

For Knudsen diffusion, path length λ is replaced with pore diameter $d$, as species A is now more likely to collide with the pore wall as opposed with another molecule. The Knudsen diffusivity for diffusing species A, $D_{KA}$ is thus

$${D_{KA}} = {d u\over {3}} = {{d\over{3}}} \sqrt{{8 R T}\over {\pi M_{A}}},$$

where $R$ is the gas constant (8.3144 J/(mol·K) in SI units), molar mass $M_{A}$ is expressed in units of kg/mol, and temperature T (in kelvins). Knudsen diffusivity $D_{KA}$ thus depends on the pore diameter, species molar mass and temperature. Expressed as a molecular flux, Knudsen diffusion follows the equation for Fick's first law of diffusion:

$$J_K = -\nabla n D_{KA}$$

Here, $J_K$ is the molecular flux in mol/m²·s, $n$ is the molar concentration in $\rm mol/m^3$. The diffusive flux is driven by a concentration gradient, which in most cases is embodied as a pressure gradient (i.e. $n=P/RT$ therefore $\nabla n=\frac{\Delta P}{RTl}$ where $\Delta P$ is the pressure difference between both sides of the pore and $l$ is the length of the pore).

If we assume that $\Delta P$ is much less than $P_{\rm ave}$, the average absolute pressure in the system (i.e. $\Delta P \ll P_{\rm ave}$) then we can express the Knudsen flux as a volumetric flow rate as follows:

$$Q_K=\frac{\Delta Pd^3}{6lP_{\rm ave}} \sqrt{\frac{2\pi RT}{M_A}}$$,

where $Q_K$ is the volumetric flow rate in $\rm m^3/s$. If the pore is relatively short, entrance effects can significantly reduce to net flux through the pore. In this case, the law of effusion can be used to calculate the excess resistance due to entrance effects rather easily by substituting an effective length $l_{\rm e}=l+\tfrac{4}{3}d$ in for $l$. Generally, the Knudsen process is significant only at low pressure and small pore diameter. However there may be instances where both Knudsen diffusion and molecular diffusion $D_{AB}$ are important. The effective diffusivity of species A in a binary mixture of A and B, $D_{Ae}$ is determined by

$$\frac{1}{{{D}_{Ae}}}=\frac{1-\alpha {{y}_{a}}}{{{D}_{AB}}}+\frac{1}{{{D}_{KA}}},$$

where $\alpha = 1 + \tfrac{{{N}_{B}}}{{{N}_{A}}}$ and ${N}_{i}$ is the flux of component i. For cases where α = 0 ($N_{A} = -N_{B}$, i.e. countercurrent diffusion) or where $y_{A}$ is close to zero, the equation reduces to

$$\frac{1}{{{D}_{Ae}}}=\frac{1}{{{D}_{AB}}}+\frac{1}{{{D}_{KA}}}.$$

== Knudsen self diffusion ==
In the Knudsen diffusion regime, the molecules do not interact with one another, so that they move in straight lines between points on the pore channel surface. Self-diffusivity is a measure of the translational mobility of individual molecules. Under conditions of thermodynamic equilibrium, a molecule is tagged and its trajectory followed over a long time. If the motion is diffusive, and in a medium without long-range correlations, the squared displacement of the molecule from its original position will eventually grow linearly with time (Einstein’s equation). To reduce statistical errors in simulations, the self-diffusivity, $D_{S}$, of a species is defined from ensemble averaging Einstein’s equation over a large enough number of molecules N.

== See also ==
- Knudsen flow
- Knudsen equation
- Atomic diffusion
- Mass diffusivity
