= Orders of magnitude (pressure) =

Comparison of a wide range of pressures

This is a tabulated listing of the orders of magnitude in relation to pressure expressed in pascals. psi values, prefixed with + and -, denote values relative to Earth's sea level standard atmospheric pressure (psig); otherwise, psia is assumed.

Magnitude	Pressure	lbf/in^{2} or dB	Item
10^{−17} Pa	10 aPa		Pressure in outer space in intergalactic voids
10^{−15} Pa	1–10 fPa		Pressure in outer space between stars in the Milky Way
10^{−12} Pa	< 1 pPa		Lowest pressure obtained in laboratory conditions
10^{−11} Pa
10^{−11} Pa	40 pPa		Atmosphere of the Moon at lunar day, very approximately (4×10^{−11} Pa)
10^{−10} Pa	< 100 pPa		Extreme-high vacuum
10^{−10} Pa	100 pPa		Atmosphere of Mercury, very approximately (1×10^{−10} Pa)
10^{−10} Pa	300 pPa		Atmosphere of the Moon at lunar night, very approximately (3×10^{−10} Pa)
10^{−9} Pa	< 1 nPa		Vacuum expected in the beam pipe of the Large Hadron Collider's ATLAS experiment (operates at a pressure of 1 nPa to 10 nPa)
10^{−9} Pa	~1 nPa		Approximate solar wind pressure at Earth's distance from the Sun (variable)
10^{−8} Pa	10 nPa		Pressure inside a vacuum chamber for laser cooling of atoms (magneto-optical trap)
10^{−8} Pa	10–700 nPa		Atmospheric pressure in low Earth orbit, around 500 km altitude
10^{−7} Pa	100 nPa		Highest pressure still considered ultra-high vacuum
10^{−6} Pa	0.1 - 10 μPa		Pressure inside a cathode-ray tube (approximate)
10^{−6} Pa	1 μPa		Reference pressure for sound in water
10^{−6} Pa	1 μPa		Pressure inside a vacuum tube (very approximate)
10^{−5} Pa	10 μPa		Radiation pressure of sunlight on a perfectly reflecting surface at the distance of the Earth.
10^{−5} Pa	20 μPa	0 dB	Reference pressure for sound in air
10^{−5} Pa	±20 μPa	0 dB	Threshold of human hearing
10^{−4} Pa			
10^{−3} Pa	1–100 mPa		Vacuum pressures used for molecular distillation
10^{−2} Pa			
10^{−1} Pa	100 mPa		Upper limit of high vacuum
10^{−1} Pa	~200 mPa		Atmospheric pressure on Pluto (1988 figure; very roughly)
10^{−1} Pa	737.4 mPa		Pressure exerted by a single Letter-sized 20-lb sheet of paper laid flat.
1 Pa	1 Pa		Pressure exerted by a US dollar bill resting flat on a surface
1 Pa	1 Pa		Upper limit of molecular distillation, where the mean free path of molecules is larger than the equipment size
10 Pa	10 Pa		Pressure increase per millimeter of a water column at Earth mean sea level
10 Pa	10 Pa		Pressure due to direct impact of a gentle breeze (~14 km/h or 9 mph)
10 Pa	86 Pa		Pressure from the weight of a US penny lying flat
10^{2} Pa	100 Pa		Pressure due to direct impact of a strong breeze (~45 km/h or 28 mph)
10^{2} Pa	120 Pa		Pressure from the weight of a US quarter lying flat
10^{2} Pa	133 Pa		1 torr ≈ 1 mmHg
10^{2} Pa	±200 Pa	~140 dB	Threshold of pain pressure level for sound where prolonged exposure may lead to hearing loss
10^{2} Pa	±300 Pa	±0.043 psi	Lung air pressure difference moving the normal breaths of a person (only 0.3% of standard atmospheric pressure)
10^{2} Pa	400–900 Pa	0.06–0.13 psi	Atmospheric pressure on Mars, < 1% of atmospheric sea-level pressure on Earth
10^{2} Pa	611.657 Pa	0.089 psi	Partial vapor pressure at the triple point of water
10^{3} Pa	1–10 kPa		Typical explosion peak overpressure needed to break glass windows (approximate)
10^{3} Pa	2 kPa		Pressure of popping popcorn (very approximate)
10^{3} Pa	2.6 kPa	0.38 psi	Pressure at which water boils at room temperature (22 °C or 72 °F) (20 mmHg)
10^{3} Pa	5 kPa	0.8 psi	Blood pressure fluctuation (40 mmHg) between heartbeats for a typical healthy adult
10^{3} Pa	6.3 kPa	0.9 psi	Pressure where water boils at normal human body temperature (37 °C or 99 °F), the pressure below which humans absolutely cannot survive (Armstrong limit)
10^{3} Pa	+9.8 kPa	+1.4 psi	Lung pressure that a typical person can exert (74 mmHg)
10^{4} Pa	10 kPa	1.5 psi	Pressure increase per meter of a water column
10^{4} Pa	10 kPa	1.5 psi	Decrease in air pressure when going from Earth sea level to 1000 m elevation
10^{4} Pa	+13 kPa	+1.9 psi	High air pressure for human lung, measured for trumpet player making staccato high notes
10^{4} Pa	< +16 kPa	+2.3 psi	Systolic blood pressure in a healthy adult while at rest (< 120 mmHg) (gauge pressure)
10^{4} Pa	+19.3 kPa	+2.8 psi	High end of lung pressure, exertable without injury by a healthy person for brief times
10^{4} Pa	+34 kPa	+5 psi	Level of long-duration blast overpressure (from a large-scale explosion) that would cause most buildings to collapse
10^{4} Pa	34 kPa		Atmospheric pressure at the summit of Mount Everest
10^{4} Pa	+70 kPa	+10 psi	Pressure for paint exiting an HVLP (low-pressure) paint spray gun
10^{4} Pa	70 kPa		Pressure inside an incandescent light bulb
10^{4} Pa	75 kPa		Minimum airplane cabin pressure and lowest pressure for normal breathing (at 8,000 ft or 2,440 m) and also the limit stated by the Federal Aviation Regulation (FAR)
10^{4} Pa	80 kPa	12 psi	Pressure inside vacuum cleaner at sea level on Earth (80% of standard atmospheric pressure)
10^{4} Pa	87 kPa	13 psi	Record low atmospheric pressure for typhoon/hurricane (Typhoon Tip in 1979) (only 86% of standard atmospheric pressure)
10^{5} Pa	100 kPa	14.5 psi	1 bar, approximately equal to the weight of one kilogram (1 kilopond) acting on one square centimeter
10^{5} Pa	101.325 kPa	14.7 psi	Standard atmospheric pressure for Earth sea level
10^{5} Pa	150 to > 550 kPa	25 to > 80 psi	Impact pressure of a fist punch (approximate)
10^{5} Pa	+180 to +250 kPa	+26 to +36 psi	Air pressure in an automobile tire relative to atmosphere (gauge pressure)
10^{5} Pa	+210 to +900 kPa	+30 to +130 psi	Air pressure in a bicycle tire relative to atmosphere
10^{5} Pa	300 kPa	50 psi	Water pressure of a garden hose
10^{5} Pa	300 to 700 kPa	50–100 psi	Typical water pressure of a municipal water supply in the US
10^{5} Pa	358 to 524 kPa	52-76 psi	Threshold of pain for objects outside the human body hitting it
10^{5} Pa	400 to 600 kPa	60–90 psi	Carbon dioxide pressure in a champagne bottle
10^{5} Pa	520 kPa	75 psi	Partial vapour pressure at the triple point of carbon dioxide
10^{5} Pa	+690 to +830 kPa	+100 to +120 psi	Air pressure in a heavy truck/bus tire relative to atmosphere
10^{5} Pa	800 kPa	120 psi	Vapor pressure of water in a kernel of popcorn when the kernel ruptures
10^{6} Pa	0.8–2 MPa	120–290 psi	Pressure used in boilers of steam locomotives
10^{6} Pa	1.1 MPa	162 psi	Pressure of an average human bite
10^{6} Pa	2.8–8.3 MPa	400–1,200 psi	Pressure of carbon dioxide propellant in a paintball gun
10^{6} Pa	5 MPa	700 psi	Water pressure of the output of a coin-operated car wash spray nozzle
10^{6} Pa	5 MPa	700 psi	Military submarine max. rated pressure (est.) of Seawolf-class nuclear submarine, at depth of 500 m
10^{6} Pa	10-21 MPa	1,500–3,000 psi	Chamber pressure of a high-powered (non-carbon dioxide) air gun
10^{6} Pa	6.9–27 MPa	1,000–4,000 psi	Water spray pressure used by pressure washers
10^{6} Pa	9.2 MPa	1,300 psi	Atmosphere of Venus
10^{7} Pa	> 10 MPa	> 1,500 psi	Pressure exerted by a 45 kg (100 lb) person wearing stiletto heels when a heel hits the floor
10^{7} Pa	15.5 MPa	2,250 psi	Primary coolant loop of a pressurized water reactor
10^{7} Pa	20 MPa	2,900 psi	Typical pressure used for hydrogenolysis reactions
10^{7} Pa	21 MPa	3,000 psi	Pressure of a typical aluminium scuba tank of pressurized air (210 bar)
10^{7} Pa	21 MPa	3,000 psi	Ballistic pressure exerted as high-power bullet strikes a solid bulletproof object
10^{7} Pa	22 MPa	3,200 psi	Critical pressure of water
10^{7} Pa	28 MPa	4,100 psi	Overpressure caused by the bomb explosion during the Oklahoma City bombing
10^{7} Pa	40 MPa	5,800 psi	Water pressure at the depth of the wreck of the Titanic
10^{7} Pa	69 MPa	10,000 psi	Water pressure withstood by the DSV Shinkai 6500 in visiting ocean depths of > 6500 meters
10^{7} Pa	70 to 280 MPa	10,000 to 40,000 psi	Maximal chamber pressure during a pistol firing
10^{8} Pa	110 MPa	16,000 psi	Pressure at bottom of Mariana Trench, about 11 km below ocean surface (1100 bar)
10^{8} Pa	100 to 300 MPa	15,000 to 44,000 psi	Pressure inside reactor for the synthesis of high-pressure polyethylene (HPPE)
10^{8} Pa	250 MPa	36,000 psi	Record diesel engine common rail fuel system pressure
10^{8} Pa	400 MPa	58,000 psi	Chamber pressure of late 1910s .50 Browning machine gun discharge
10^{8} Pa	240–620 MPa	35,000–90,000 psi	Water pressure used in a water jet cutter
10^{9} Pa	1 GPa		Extremely high-pressure chemical reactors (10 kbar)
10^{9} Pa	1.5 GPa		Diamond melts using a 3 kJ laser without turning into graphite first
10^{9} Pa	1.5 GPa	220,000 psi	Tensile strength of Inconel 625
10^{9} Pa	5.8 GPa	840,000 psi	Ultimate tensile strength of the polymer Zylon
10^{10} Pa	10 GPa		Pressure at which octaoxygen forms at room temperature (100,000 bar)
10^{10} Pa	18 GPa		Pressure needed for the first commercially successful synthesis of diamond
10^{10} Pa	24 to 110 GPa		Stability range of enstatite in its perovskite-structured polymorph, possibly the most common mineral inside the Earth
10^{10} Pa	40 GPa		Quantum-mechanical electron degeneracy pressure in a block of copper
10^{10} Pa	48 GPa		Detonation pressure of pure CL-20, the most powerful high explosive in mass production
10^{10} Pa	69 GPa	10,000,000 psi	Highest water jet pressure attained in research lab
10^{10} Pa	96 GPa		Pressure at which metallic oxygen forms (960,000 bar)
10^{11} Pa	100 GPa		Theoretical tensile strength of a carbon nanotube (CNT)
10^{11} Pa	130 GPa		Ultimate tensile strength of monolayer graphene
10^{11} Pa	360 GPa		Pressure inside Earth's inner core (3.64 million bar)
10^{11} Pa	495 GPa		Lower bound at which metallic hydrogen theoretically forms
10^{11} Pa	> 600 GPa		Pressure attainable with a diamond anvil cell
10^{12} Pa	5 TPa		Pressure generated by the National Ignition Facility fusion reactor
10^{13} Pa	10 TPa		Solid matter changes to the metastable inner-shell molecular state
10^{13} Pa	32.9 TPa		Pressure at which metallic helium theoretically forms
10^{14} Pa	100 TPa		Pressure generated by the extremely high-pressure laser implosion plasmas generator.
10^{14} Pa	208.4 TPa		Pressure at which metallic neon theoretically forms (the highest metallization pressure for any element)
10^{14} Pa	540 TPa		Pressure inside an "Ivy Mike"-like nuclear bomb detonation (5.3 billion bar)
10^{15} Pa	6.5 PPa		Pressure inside a W80 nuclear warhead detonation (64 billion bar)
10^{16} Pa	25 PPa		Pressure inside Sun's core (250 billion bar)
10^{23} Pa	100 EPa - 100 YPa		Pressure inside the core of a white dwarf at the Chandrasekhar limit
10^{32} Pa	3.2-160 QPa		Pressure range inside a neutron star
10^{35} Pa			Approximate pressure at the center of a proton
...	...	...	...
10^{113} Pa	4.6×10^{113} Pa	6.7×10^{109} psi	The Planck pressure (4.63×10^{108} bar)
