= Cunningham correction factor =

Number used to correct drag calculations for small particles in a fluid

In fluid dynamics, the Cunningham correction factor, or Cunningham slip correction factor (denoted C), is used to account for non-continuum effects when calculating the drag on small particles. The derivation of Stokes' law, which is used to calculate the drag force on small particles, assumes a no-slip condition which is no longer correct at high Knudsen numbers. The Cunningham slip correction factor allows predicting the drag force on a particle moving a fluid with Knudsen number between the continuum regime and free molecular flow.

The drag coefficient calculated with standard correlations is divided by the Cunningham correction factor, C, given below.

Ebenezer Cunningham derived the correction factor in 1910 and with Robert Andrews Millikan, verified the correction in the same year.

$$C = 1+ \frac{2\lambda}{d} \left(A_1+A_2 e^{\frac{-A_3 d}{\lambda}} \right)$$

where

- C is the correction factor
- λ is the mean free path
- d is the particle diameter
- A_{n} are experimentally determined coefficients.

For air (Davies, 1945):

A_{1} = 1.257
A_{2} = 0.400
A_{3} = 0.55

The Cunningham correction factor becomes significant when particles become smaller than 15 micrometers, for air at ambient conditions.

For sub-micrometer particles, Brownian motion must be taken into account.
