= Rarefied gas dynamics =

Low-Density Gases

Particle simulation of Argon gas flowing over a flat plate at angle of attack

Rarefied gas dynamics is a branch of fluid mechanics where the continuum assumption is no longer accurate, as a characteristic length scale in the gas (e.g. radius of a body moving in a gas, radius of a tube conducting a gas, etc.) becomes comparable to the mean free path of gaseous particles. Consequently, the gas cannot be described as a continuum. Instead, the gas should be described by its microstate determined by the velocity and position of each particle. Since it would be an impossible computational task in storing the very large volumes of information involved in tracking the behavior of every single particle, the statistical or kinetic theory of gases must be used. This theory consists in obtaining the macroscopic state of the gas described by quantities such as density, bulk velocity, temperature, pressure tensor, and heat flux from the microstate of the gas. To describe non-equilibrium phenomena in rarefied gases, the Boltzmann transport equation must be used, which is the appropriate mathematical tool for this purpose.

== Brief history ==
The history of rarefied gas dynamics starts with the kinetic theory of gases. In 1860, Maxwell published results on the distribution of molecular velocities for a gas in equilibrium, which is called the Maxwell-Boltzmann distribution. As a result, the assumption that all molecules move with the same speed was abandoned and the random nature of molecular motion was recognized. In 1872, Boltzmann derived an integro-differential equation (Boltzmann equation) to describe the evolution of the velocity distribution function in space and time. In the same paper, Boltzmann proved the H-theorem demonstrating that intermolecular collisions always produce entropy. In other words, the Boltzmann equation is irreversible.

In 1912, Hilbert proved the existence and uniqueness of a solution of the Boltzmann Equation. A connection between the kinetic theory and fluid dynamics was done by Chapman and Enskog who derived the Euler and Navier-Stokes equations based upon a series expansion of the Boltzmann equation with respect to the Knudsen number. This approach allowed to derive expressions for the viscosity and thermal conductivity directly from intermolecular interaction potentials. Furthermore, considering higher order terms of the expansion, Burnett derived more general constitutive equations for the pressure tensor and heat flux. Then, Grad proved the equivalence of the equations of fluid dynamics to an asymptotic form of the Boltzmann equation. The scientific branch of rarefied gas dynamics consolidated in the 19th century and became forefront with space exploration. As a result, the first international symposium on rarefied gas dynamics was held in Nice, France in July 1958.

== Knudsen number ==
To determine if a gas can be classified as rarefied, the non-dimensional Knudsen number is usually calculated. The Knudsen number $\ce{\mathrm{Kn}}$ is defined as the ratio of the mean free path $\lambda$, to a characteristic length scale $L$ in the flow, i.e. $\ce{\mathrm{Kn}}$=$\lambda/L$. The value of the Knudsen number tells you whether a molecular modeling approach must be used or a macroscopic description is sufficient. High and intermediate Knudsen numbers mean that the gas is rarefied, while very small Knudsen numbers imply that the gas is a continuum. Various flow regimes can be distinguished based on the value of the Knudsen number. Namely, a gas flow regime can be characterized as continuum (or viscous), slip, transitional, and free-molecular.

The following rough ranges of the Knudsen number for these regimes are usually established:

- $\ce{\mathrm{Kn}}$$< 0.01$ for continuum or viscous regime;
- $0.01 <$$\ce{\mathrm{Kn}}$$< 0.10$ for slip flow regime;
- $0.1 <$ $\ce{\mathrm{Kn}}$ $< 10$ for transitional regime;
- $\ce{\mathrm{Kn}}$ $> 10$ for free-molecular regime.

This division between the regimes can vary depending on flow type and required accuracy. The mathematical approach and tool to model a gas flow depends on the flow regime. In the continuum regime, the gas is not rarefied and hence can be described by the Euler or Navier-Stokes equations. In the slip flow regime, the Navier-Stokes equations are applied too, but the velocity no-slip and temperature continuity boundary conditions are replaced by the velocity slip and temperature jump conditions. All approaches to model gas flows in the transitional regime are based on the Boltzmann transport equation. Since the intermolecular collisions are neglected in the free-molecular regime, the Boltzmann equation is applied in its simplified form.

== Velocity distribution function ==
When the continuum assumption is fulfilled, the molecular nature of the gas is neglected and the spatial and temporal variations of the flow are described in terms of its macroscopic properties such as velocity, density, pressure, and temperature. In this case, the Navier-Stokes equations provides the appropriate mathematical model of fluid flows. However, the continuum assumption is broken in a rarefied gas flow, therefore a modeling of such a flow is based on the Boltzmann transport equation. In this case, the molecular nature of the gas must be considered by means of the velocity distribution function $f(t,\mathbf{r},\mathbf{v})$ where $t$ is the time, $\mathbf{r}$ is a vector of spatial coordinates and $\mathbf{v}$ is a velocity of molecules. This function provides a statistical description of the gas on the molecular level. Taking moments of the velocity distribution function leads to macroscopic properties of a gas flow, thus providing the connection between microscopic and macroscopic levels. The evolution of the velocity distribution function is described by the Boltzmann equation, which is valid for a dilute gas. In such a gas, the mean distance between molecules is significantly larger than the molecular size, meaning that the intermolecular collisions are predominantly binary. Another important assumption in the derivation of the Boltzmann transport equation is molecular chaos, which means that the velocities of particles during their free motion between collisions are uncorrelated, and independent of their positions.

When a rarefied gas is restricted by a solid surface, the interaction of the gas molecules with this surfaces should be considered. Such an interaction leads to the momentum and heat transfer between the gas and the solid surface. This implies that the Boltzmann equation must be accompanied by boundary conditions determined by the interaction of gas molecules with the solid walls.

== Mathematical approaches ==
The Boltzmann equation is valid for a dilute gas flow in the whole range of the Knudsen number. However, a general solution of this equation requires significant computational effort, therefore several mathematical approaches to model rarefied gases were developed depending on the flow regime.

=== Slip flow regime ===
In the slip flow regime, the gas rarefaction is moderate allowing to use a Navier-Stokes solver subject to the velocity slip and temperature jump boundary conditions on a solid surface. The slip and jump coefficients calculated on the molecular level are universal and can be applied to any geometrical configuration of the gas flow.

=== Free molecular regime ===
In the free molecular regime, the intermolecular collisions are neglected so that each particle moves independently on each other. In this case, the Boltzmann equation is significantly simplified. All macroscopic properties of a gas flow around a convex body are obtained in the form of integral, since a gas molecule undergoes only one interaction with the body surface. Internal flows and external flows around a concave body involve multiple gas-surface interactions. In this case, the macroscopic characteristics are calculated from an integral equation. An alternative approach is the test particle Monte Carlo method consisting in tracking of a large number of model particles. Since the intermolecular collisions are neglected, the molecular trajectories are independent of each other and can be modeled serially. All these approaches are described in detail in the book by Bird.

=== Transitional regime ===
The transitional regime is hardest for mathematical modeling, because the continuum assumption is broken and the intermolecular collisions cannot be neglected. Therefore, the Boltzmann equation should be solved for any specific gas flow. The discrete velocity method and fast spectral method are typically used for this task. However, an application of this method to the Boltzmann equation in its exact form is very costly so that, till now, only few very simple problems have been solved by this way. To reduce the computational cost, the Boltzmann equation is replaced by its simplified form called a model kinetic equation. Three commonly used model equations are Bhatnagar, Gross, Krook (BGK), Ellipsoidal Statistical (ES-model), and Shakhov (S-model). The computational effort to solve these model equations is essentially smaller than that to solve the Boltzmann equation itself and, at the same time, they are appropriate to solve practical problems with a reasonable accuracy. Some examples of numerical solvers are based on the model equations can be found here.

The Direct Simulation Monte Carlo (DSMC) is a probabilistic method proposed by G.A. Bird. It consists of tracking of a huge number of model particles simultaneously decoupling the processes of their free motion and collisions between them. After alternating these two processes many times, the macroscopic characteristics are calculated based on the information about positions and velocities of the model particles. A result obtained by a valid implementation of the DSMC method is equivalent to that obtained from the Boltzmann equation. The DSMC method is easily applied to complicated geometrical configurations and to flows with chemical reactions and is a widely used method to solve scientific and engineering problems related to highly non-equilibrium gas flows. It has also been applied to simulate ultra-cold quantum gases. For weakly non-equilibrium flows, the discrete velocity method applied to the Boltzmann equation or to its model is more efficient than the DSMC method.

More recent multiscale kinetic approaches seek to bridge the continuum, transitional, and free-molecular regimes within a single formulation. One example is the unified gas-kinetic framework, which classifies molecules according to their collision histories over an observation time scale and recovers the Boltzmann and Navier–Stokes descriptions as limiting cases.

== Applications ==
=== High altitude flight and hypersonic flows ===
Applications of rarefied gas dynamic methods include hypersonic flight and atmospheric entry, such as satellites in orbit, spacecraft or rockets re-entering Earth atmosphere, or entering atmosphere of another planet, or hypersonic cruise vehicles. These application areas often need RGD methods. In addition, even within a mostly continuum flow around a high-speed vehicle, there may be local regions of rarefied flow as in the wake of the vehicle or near sharp-leading edges. These rarefied flow regions must be modelled appropriately in order to determine, e.g., the drag and heating to the vehicle and the radiation emitted and plasma blackout. It also includes understanding the damage impact of micrometer aerosol atmospheric particles on the material erosion and heating at the surface.

=== Plumes and jets ===
An example of rarefied gas dynamics that combines both low density and small length scales involve thrusters on spacecraft used for maneuvering in outer space as well as rocket plumes impinging on surfaces.

=== Flow inside material microstructure ===
Rarefied gas dynamic methods are used for modeling gas flow around porous carbon-fiber materials at the microscale when designing heat shields for spacecraft with the objective of characterizing the aerothermal loading (e.g. heat flux, shear stress) and concentrations of atomic species inside the material microstructure. Here the mean free path approaches the length scale of the carbon-fibers of $10 \mu m$.

=== MEMS and NEMS ===
Very small length scales can also result in rarefied gas phenomena. Micro-Electro-Mechanical systems (MEMS) and Nanoelectromechanical systems (NEMS), which involve the fabrication and operation of microscopic devices, involve the motion of gases at very small length scales including $1 \mu m$ or $10^{-6}$ m resulting in rarefied gas dynamics

=== Gas flows around particulates and droplets ===
Solid or liquid particulates or droplets suspended in a gas flow often have size scales of $1 \mu m$ or less, leading to Kn near the particle of the order 1 and the need to include rarefaction effects. Computation of important quantities such as particle drag or heat transfer between the particle and the gas may need to use rarefied gas dynamic methods.

=== Radiometric phenomena ===
A variety of interesting phenomena and micro-device concepts have been investigated that rely on the effects of temperature differences acting in the rarefied or transitional gas-flow regime. Notable examples include the Crookes radiometer, Knudsen compressors, radiometric force actuators and photophoretic phenomena.

=== Low-density plasmas, materials processing and plasma processing ===
Considerable work has used DSMC and other rarefied gas dynamic approaches to understand and predict flows and behavior of low-density and weakly-ionized plasmas. In these cases, other simulation approaches are generally coupled with or overlaid on the DSMC to simulate the plasma interactions. This rich literature includes studies of ion sputtering and deposition, chemical etching, and chemical vapor deposition for materials processing. There is also extensive work on ion engines and Hall-effect thrusters.

=== Need for hybrid methods ===
Some of above flows have vastly different density or Kn in some spatial or temporal regions where they transition between continuum and free-molecular conditions (plumes; hypersonic flows around complex shapes) and thus may require hybrid solution methods.
