= Subexponential distribution =

A subexponential distribution may be:

- A kind of heavy-tailed distribution.
- A distribution with sufficiently light tails so that a certain Orlicz norm of the distribution is finite, or equivalently has distribution function dominated by that of an exponential random variable.
