= Distribution function =

Distribution function may refer to

- Cumulative distribution function, a basic concept of probability theory
- Distribution function (physics), a function giving the number of particles per unit volume in single-particle phase space
- Distribution function (measure theory), a generalization of the probabilistic concept
