= R. Stephen White =

American physicist

- Born: Robert Stephen White; December 8, 1920; Ellsworth, Kansas, U.S.
- Died: April 8, 2018 (aged 97); Santa Barbara, California, U.S.
- Education: Southwestern College; University of Illinois Urbana-Champaign; University of California, Berkeley
- Occupation: Physicist
- Spouse: Freda Marie Bridgewater (m. 1942; died. 2013)

Robert Stephen White (December 8, 1920 – April 8, 2018) was an American physicist.

== Early life and career ==
White was born in Ellsworth, Kansas, the son of Byron and Sebina White. He attended Southwestern College, earning his BA degree in 1942. He also attended the University of Illinois Urbana-Champaign, earning his MS degree in physics in 1943. His education was interrupted when he served as a naval officer, and developed thermal diffusion separation for the Manhattan Project during World War II. After his discharge, he attended the University of California, Berkeley, earning his PhD degree in 1951.

White served as a professor in the department of physics at the University of California, Riverside from 1967 to 1990. During his years as a professor, he was named a distinguished professor, and in 1969, he was named a fellow of the American Physical Society.

== Personal life and death ==
In 1942, White married Freda Marie Bridgewater in Beaver, Oklahoma. Their marriage lasted until her death in 2013.

White died at his home in Santa Barbara, California on April 8, 2018, at the age of 97.
