= Sampson flow =

Sampson flow is defined as fluid flow through an infinitely thin orifice in the viscous flow regime for low Reynolds number. It is derived from an analytical solution to the Navier-Stokes equations. The below equation can be used to calculate the total volumetric flowrate through such an orifice:

$$Q_S=\Delta P d^3 / 24 \mu$$

Here, $Q_S$ is the volumetric flowrate in $m^3/sec$, $\Delta P$ is the pressure difference in Pa, $d$ is the pore diameter in m, and $\mu$ is the fluid's dynamic viscosity in Pa·s. The flow can also be expressed as a molecular flux as:

$$J_S=P_{ave} \Delta P d/6\pi\mu k_BT$$

Here, $J_S$ is the molecular flux in atoms/m^{2}·sec, $P_{ave}$ is the average of the pressures on either side of the orifice, $k_B$ is the Boltzmann constant, ($1.38\times10^{-23}$ J/K), and $T$ is the absolute temperature in K.

Sampson flow is the macroscopic analog of effusion flow, which describes stochastic diffusion of molecules through an orifice much smaller than the mean-free-path of the gas molecules. For pore diameters on the order of the mean-free-path of the fluid, flow will occur with contributions from the molecular regime as well as the viscous regime, obeying the dusty gas model according to the following equation:

$$Q_{total}=Q_S+Q_E$$

Here, $Q_{total}$ is the total volumetric flowrate and $Q_E$ is the volumetric flowrate according to the law of effusion. As it turns out, for many gasses, we notice equal contributions from molecular and viscous regimes when the pore size is significantly larger than the mean-free-path of the fluid, for nitrogen this occurs at a pore diameter of 393 nm, 6.0× larger than the mean-free-path.
