= Deborah Levin =

American aerospace engineer

Deborah Ann Levin Fliflet is an American aerospace engineer, and a professor in the Aerospace Engineering Department at the University of Illinois Urbana-Champaign. Her research involves the fluid dynamics, computational modeling, and simulation of hypersonic and chemically reacting flows. Beyond aerospace engineering, she has also applied this work in planetary science, in the study of volcanism on Io.

== Education and career ==
Levin is originally from Brooklyn; her parents were a stockbroker and a schoolteacher. She majored in chemistry at Stony Brook University, graduating in 1974. She continued her studies at the California Institute of Technology, where she completed her Ph.D. in 1979. Her doctoral dissertation, Ab Initio Calculations of Processes in Low Energy Electron-Molecule Scattering, was supervised by B. Vince McKoy.

After working as a research staff member in the Institute for Defense Analyses from 1979 until 1998, she returned to academia as a research professor and lecturer in chemistry at George Washington University in 1998. She moved to Pennsylvania State University in 2000, becoming a regular-rank associate professor of aerospace engineering; she was promoted to full professor in 2007. She moved to her present position at the University of Illinois in 2014.

== Research ==
Levin’s research focuses on chemically reacting hypersonic flows, space plasmas, and electric propulsion. She has developed high-fidelity DSMC models to simulate phenomena such as shock bi-modality, particulate lifting in blast waves, and heat transfer in hypersonic boundary layers. Her work has supported NASA’s return-to-flight efforts following the Columbia disaster, including modeling atomic oxygen erosion of Shuttle tiles.

== Recognition ==
Levin was named as a Fellow of the American Institute of Aeronautics and Astronautics in 2014. In 2025, Levin received the AIAA Thermophysics Award "for her pioneering work in deriving thermo-physical insights into complex, multiscale high-speed flows using particle kinetic simulation approaches". Her contributions to hypersonics, particularly through the development of heterogeneous computing algorithms for Direct Simulation Monte Carlo (DSMC), were recognized by NASA Ames Research Center.

== Personal life ==
Levin married Arne W. Fliflet, a physicist whom she met when she was a graduate student and he was a postdoctoral researcher at Caltech; they have four children. When Levin moved to the University of Illinois, Fliflet moved with her, becoming a lecturer in electrical and computer engineering.
