= Thermal diffusion =

Thermal diffusion may refer to:

- A thermal force on a gas due to a temperature gradient, also called thermal diffusion or Thermal transpiration.
  - It is used to drive a gas pump with no moving parts called a Knudsen pump.
  - It is the currently accepted theory for the rotation of the Crookes radiometer.
- Diffusion in a temperature gradient, also called thermodiffusion or thermophoresis.
  - It can be used as an obsolete method of making enriched uranium (see enriched uranium § thermal diffusion).
  - Thermal diffusion can be used to measure fluid flow, including perfusion and rCBF at one location over time.
- Brownian motion (at a constant non-zero absolute temperature).

See also:

- Molecular diffusion
- Heat conduction (i.e., diffusion of heat)
