= Thermal transpiration =

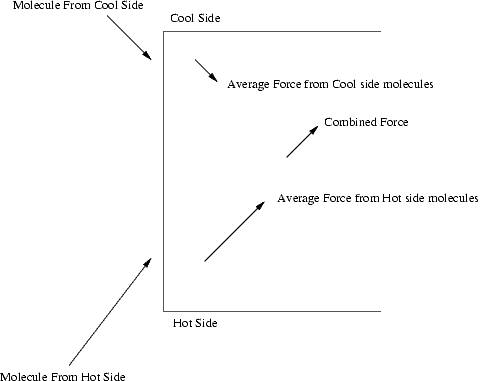
Diagram showing pressure difference induced by a temperature difference.

Thermal transpiration (or thermal diffusion) refers to the thermal force on a gas due to a temperature difference. Thermal transpiration causes a flow of gas in the absence of any other pressure difference, and is able to maintain a certain pressure difference called thermomolecular pressure difference in a steady state. The effect is strongest when the mean free path of the gas molecules is comparable to the dimensions of the gas container.

Thermal transpiration appears as an important correction in the readings of vapor pressure thermometers, and the effect is historically famous as being an explanation for the rotation of the Crookes radiometer.

== See also ==
- Knudsen pump — a gas pump with no moving parts which functions via thermal transpiration.
- Thermophoresis (Soret effect) — diffusion of colloidal particles in a liquid, induced by a temperature gradient.
