= Knudsen layer =

Thin layer of vapor near a liquid or solid

The Knudsen layer, also known as evaporation layer, is the thin layer of vapor near a liquid or solid. It is named after Danish physicist Martin Knudsen (1871–1949).

== Definition ==
At the interface of a vapor and a liquid/solid, the gas interaction with the liquid/solid dominates the gas behavior, and the gas is, very locally, not in equilibrium. This region, several mean free path lengths thick, is called the Knudsen layer.

== Knudsen layer thickness ==
The Knudsen layer thickness can be approximated by $l_c$, given by

$$l_c =\frac{k T_s}{\pi d^2 p_s}$$,

where $k$ is the Boltzmann constant, $T_s$ is the temperature, $d$ is the molecular diameter and $p_s$ is the pressure.

== Applications ==
One of the applications of Knudsen layer is in the coma of comets. It has been used specially in the coma chemistry model (ComChem model).
