= Knudsen force =

Knudsen force is the force experienced by two surfaces at two different temperatures that are separated by a distance comparable to a mean free path of the molecules of the ambient medium.

== See also ==
- Microcantilever
