= Knudsen absolute manometer =

Pressure measurement device

A Knudsen absolute manometer is an instrument to measure absolute pressures. Named after Martin Knudsen.

== Working principle ==
Pressure is determined by the interaction of particles with a surface, its kinetic energy, and is temperature dependent. When a particle hits a hotter surface, heat transfer will take place and the particle will gain energy. When a particle hits a colder surface, the opposite occurs. Particles that interact with a hotter or colder surface will exert a force on that surface. A Knudsen manometer uses this temperature-effect to make a plate with dual temperatures rotate. It consists of a rotating plate, of which the centre of rotation is in the centre of the plate. Image the plate rotating, the parts that push the 'air' are the plate parts that are 'normal' temperature, the other sides are heated. At the heated sides the particles that interact will gain kinetic energy and push to plate to rotation. By reading the speed of this rotation the pressure can be determined. (This is an interpretation from the information about Knudsen manometer from the Dutch book Vacuum Technologie)
