= Molecular distillation =

Molecular distillation is a type of short-path vacuum distillation, characterized by an extremely low vacuum pressure, 0.01 torr or below, which is performed using a molecular still. It is a process of separation, purification and concentration of natural products, complex and thermally sensitive molecules for example vitamins and polyunsaturated fatty acids. This process is characterized by short term exposure of the distillate liquid to high temperatures in high vacuum (around 10^{−4} mmHg) in the distillation column and a small distance between the evaporator and the condenser around 2 cm. In molecular distillation, fluids are in the free molecular flow regime, i.e. the mean free path of molecules is comparable to the size of the equipment. The gaseous phase no longer exerts significant pressure on the substance to be evaporated, and consequently, rate of evaporation no longer depends on pressure. The motion of molecules is in the line of sight, because they do not form a continuous gas anymore. Thus, a short path between the hot surface and the cold surface is necessary, typically by suspending a hot plate covered with a film of feed next to a cold plate with a line of sight in between.

This process has the advantages of avoiding the problem of toxicity that occurs in techniques that use solvents as the separating agent, and also of minimizing losses due to thermal decomposition. and can be used in a continuous feed process to harvest distillate without having to break vacuum.

Molecular distillation is used industrially for purification of oils. It is also used to enrich borage oil in γ-linolenic acid (GLA) and also to recover tocopherols from deodorizer distillate of soybean oil (DDSO). Molecular stills were historically used by Wallace Carothers in the synthesis of larger polymers, as a reaction product, water, interfered with polymerization by undoing the reaction via hydrolysis, but the water could be removed by the molecular still.

== See also ==
- Fragrance extraction – Separation process of aromatic compounds from raw materials
