= Effusion =

Process of a gas escaping through a small hole

The image on the left shows effusion, whereas the image on the right shows diffusion. Effusion occurs through an orifice smaller than the mean free path of the particles in motion, whereas diffusion occurs through an opening in which multiple particles can flow through simultaneously.

In physics and chemistry, effusion is the process in which a gas escapes from a container through a hole of diameter considerably smaller than the mean free path of the molecules. Such a hole is often described as a pinhole and the escape of the gas is due to the pressure difference between the container and the exterior.

Under these conditions, essentially all molecules which arrive at the hole continue and pass through the hole, since collisions between molecules in the region of the hole are negligible. Conversely, when the diameter is larger than the mean free path of the gas, flow obeys the Sampson flow law.

In medical terminology, an effusion refers to accumulation of fluid in an anatomic space, usually without loculation. Specific examples include subdural, mastoid, pericardial and pleural effusions.

== Etymology ==
The word effusion derives from the Latin word, effundo, which means "shed", "pour forth", "pour out", "utter", "lavish", "waste".

== Into a vacuum ==
Effusion from an equilibrated container into outside vacuum can be calculated based on kinetic theory. The number of atomic or molecular collisions with a wall of a container per unit area per unit time (impingement rate) is given by:
$$J_\text{impingement} = \frac{P}{\sqrt{2 \pi m k_\text{B} T}}.$$
assuming mean free path is much greater than pinhole diameter and the gas can be treated as an ideal gas.

If a small area $A$ on the container is punched to become a small hole, the effusive flow rate will be
$$\begin{align}
Q_\text{effusion} &= J_\text{impingement} \times A \\
&= \frac{P A}{\sqrt{2 \pi m k_\text{B} T}} \\
&= \frac{P A N_\text{A}}{\sqrt{2 \pi M R T}}
\end{align}$$
where $M$ is the molar mass, $N_\text{A}$ is the Avogadro constant, and $R = N_\text{A} k_\text{B}$ is the molar gas constant.

The average velocity of effused particles is
$$\begin{align}
\overline{v_x}&=\overline{v_y}=0\\
\overline{v_z}&=\sqrt{\frac{\pi k_\text{B}T}{2m}}.
\end{align}$$

Combined with the effusive flow rate, the recoil/thrust force on the system itself is
$$F=m\overline{v_z}{\times}Q_\text{effusion}=\frac{PA}{2}.$$

An example is the recoil force on a balloon with a small hole flying in vacuum.

== Measures of flow rate ==
According to the kinetic theory of gases, the kinetic energy for a gas at a temperature $T$ is

$$\frac{1}{2}m v_{\rm rms}^2 = \frac{3}{2}k_{\rm B} T$$

where $m$ is the mass of one molecule, $v_{\rm rms}$ is the root-mean-square speed of the molecules, and $k_{\rm B}$ is the Boltzmann constant. The average molecular speed can be calculated from the Maxwell speed distribution as $v_{\rm avg}=\sqrt{8/3\pi}\ v_{\rm rms}\approx 0.921\ v_{\rm rms}$ (or, equivalently, $v_{\rm rms}=\sqrt{3\pi/8}\ v_{\rm avg}\approx 1.085\ v_{\rm avg}$). The rate $\Phi_N$ at which a gas of molar mass $M$ effuses (typically expressed as the number of molecules passing through the hole per second) is then

$$\Phi_N = \frac{\Delta PAN_A}{\sqrt{2\pi MRT}}.$$

Here $\Delta P$ is the gas pressure difference across the barrier, $A$ is the area of the hole, $N_\text{A}$ is the Avogadro constant, $R$ is the gas constant and $T$ is the absolute temperature. Assuming the pressure difference between the two sides of the barrier is much smaller than $P_{\rm avg}$, the average absolute pressure in the system (i.e. $\Delta P\ll P_{\rm avg}$), it is possible to express effusion flow as a volumetric flow rate as follows:

$$\Phi_V=\frac{\Delta P d^2}{P_{\rm avg}}\sqrt{\frac{\pi k_\text{B}T}{32m}}$$

or

$$\Phi_V=\frac{\Delta P d^2}{P_{\rm avg}}\sqrt{\frac{\pi RT}{32M}}$$

where $\Phi_V$ is the volumetric flow rate of the gas, $P_{\rm avg}$ is the average pressure on either side of the orifice, and $d$ is the hole diameter.

== Effect of molecular weight ==
At constant pressure and temperature, the root-mean-square speed and therefore the effusion rate are inversely proportional to the square root of the molecular weight. Gases with a lower molecular weight effuse more rapidly than gases with a higher molecular weight, so that the number of lighter molecules passing through the hole per unit time is greater.

=== Graham's law ===
Scottish chemist Thomas Graham (1805–1869) found experimentally that the rate of effusion of a gas is inversely proportional to the square root of the mass of its particles. In other words, the ratio of the rates of effusion of two gases at the same temperature and pressure is given by the inverse ratio of the square roots of the masses of the gas particles.

$${\mbox{Rate of effusion of gas}_1 \over \mbox{Rate of effusion of gas}_2}=\sqrt{M_2 \over M_1}$$

where $M_1$ and $M_2$ represent the molar masses of the gases. This equation is known as Graham's law of effusion.

The effusion rate for a gas depends directly on the average velocity of its particles. Thus, the faster the gas particles are moving, the more likely they are to pass through the effusion orifice.

== Knudsen cell ==
The Knudsen cell is used to measure the vapor pressures of a solid with very low vapor pressure. Such a solid forms a vapor at low pressure by sublimation. The vapor slowly effuses through a pinhole, and the loss of mass is proportional to the vapor pressure and can be used to determine this pressure. The heat of sublimation can also be determined by measuring the vapor pressure as a function of temperature, using the Clausius–Clapeyron relation.
