= Minipermeameter =

Device for measuring permeability in rocks

In petroleum engineering, a minipermeameter is a gas-based device for measuring permeability in porous rocks.

Minipermeametry has been used in the oil industry since the late 1960s (Eijpe and Weber, 1971) without becoming in any way a standard experimental method in core analysis or reservoir characterisation. The laboratory minipermeametry can make important contributions both as an improved methodology within experimental petrophysics and as a source of data invaluable in routine reservoir characterisation (C. HALVORSEN AND A. HURST, 1990)

The values obtained from the minipermeameter should possibly be calibrated by a Klinkenberg correction
