= Knudsen pump =

The Knudsen pump also referred to as "thermal transpiration pump" or "Knudsen compressor" is a gas pump that utilizes no moving parts. Instead it uses thermal transpiration, the phenomenon that gas molecules drift from the cold end to the hot end of a narrow channel. Thus a cold vacuum chamber "transpires" into the hot chamber. This thermal transpiration flow is induced when the boundary walls of the pump have a temperature gradient. Because the pump is based simply on temperature differences and has no moving parts, it could provide reliable and precise control of gas flow for a variety of applications, such as gas-sensing breath analyzers, chemical weapons detectors, and in satellite control. It is named after Martin Knudsen, a Danish physicist.
