= Free molecular flow =

Gas flow with a relatively large mean free molecular path

Free molecular flow describes the fluid dynamics of gas where the mean free path of the molecules is larger than the size of the chamber or of the object under test. For tubes/objects of the size of several cm, this means pressures well below 10^{−3} mbar. This is also called the regime of high vacuum, or even ultra-high vacuum. This is opposed to viscous flow encountered at higher pressures. The presence of free molecular flow can be calculated, at least in estimation, with the Knudsen number (Kn). If Kn > 10, the system is in free molecular flow, also known as Knudsen flow. Knudsen flow has been defined as the transitional range between viscous flow and molecular flow, which is significant in the medium vacuum range where λ ≈ d.

Gas flow can be grouped in four regimes: For Kn≤0.001, flow is continuous, and the Navier–Stokes equations are applicable, from 0.001<Kn<0.1, slip flow occurs, from 0.1≤Kn<10, transitional flow, or rarefied gas dynamics, occurs and for Kn≥10, free molecular flow occurs.

In free molecular flow, the pressure of the remaining gas can be considered as effectively zero. Thus, boiling points do not depend on the residual pressure. The flow can be considered to be individual particles moving in straight lines. Practically, the "vapor" cannot move around bends or into other spaces behind obstacles, as they simply hit the tube wall. This implies conventional pumps cannot be used, as they rely on viscous flow and fluid pressure. Instead, special sorption pumps, ion pumps and momentum transfer pumps i.e. turbomolecular pumps are used.

Free molecular flow occurs in various processes such as molecular distillation, ultra-high vacuum equipment such as particle accelerators, and naturally in outer space.

The definition of a free molecular flow depends on the distance scale under consideration. For example, in the interplanetary medium, the plasma is in a free molecular flow regime in scales less than 1 AU; thus, planets and moons are effectively under particle bombardment. However, on larger scales, fluid-like behavior is observed, because the probability of collisions between particles becomes significant.

== Knudsen flow ==
Knudsen flow describes the movement of fluids with a Knudsen number near unity, that is, where the characteristic length in the flow space is of the same order of magnitude as the mean free path. Depending on the source there is a range mentioned of 0.1<Kn<10 for which Knudsen flow occurs. Other names for this flow regime are intermediate, transitional, or slip flow, since it represents a transition state between free molecular flow and viscous flow. Thus the flow of fluids under Knudsen flow conditions is established both by molecular phenomena and by the viscosity.

=== Separation processes ===
For a gas passing through small holes in a thin wall in the Knudsen-flow regime, the number of molecules that pass through a hole is proportional to the pressure of the gas and inversely proportional to its molecular mass. It is therefore possible to effect a partial separation of a mixture of gases if the components have different molecular masses. The technique is used to separate isotopic mixtures, such as uranium, using gaseous diffusion through porous membranes. It has also been successfully demonstrated for use in hydrogen production, as a technique for separating hydrogen from the gaseous product mixture created when water is heated at high temperatures using solar or other energy sources.

== See also ==
- Knudsen equation – Description of gas flow in free molecular flow
- Knudsen number – Dimensionless number relating to mean free path of a particle
