= Distribution function (measure theory) =

In mathematics, in particular in measure theory, there are different notions of distribution function which are used in different context. Distribution functions (in the sense of measure theory) are a generalization of distribution functions (in the sense of probability theory).

== Definitions ==
The first definition presented here is typically used in Analysis (harmonic analysis, Fourier Analysis, and integration theory in general) to analysis properties of functions.

Definition 1: Suppose $(X,\mathcal{B},\mu)$ is a measure space, and let $f$ be a real-valued measurable function. The distribution function associated with $f$ is the function $d_f:[0,\infty)\rightarrow\mathbb{R}\cup\{\infty\}$ given by
$$d_f(s)=\mu\Big(\{x\in X: |f(x)|>s\}\Big)$$
It is convenient also to define $d_f(\infty)=0$.

The function $d_f$ provides information about the size of a measurable function $f$.

The next definitions of distribution function are straight generalizations of the notion of distribution functions (in the sense of probability theory).

Definition 2. Let $\mu$ be a finite measure on the space $(\mathbb{R},\mathcal{B}(\mathbb{R}),\mu)$ of real numbers, equipped with the Borel $\sigma$-algebra. The distribution function associated to $\mu$ is the function $F_\mu \colon \R \to \R$ defined by
$$F_\mu(t)=\mu\big((-\infty,t]\big)$$

It is well known result in measure theory that if $F:\mathbb{R}\to\mathbb{R}$ is a nondecreasing right continuous function, then the function $\mu$ defined on the collection of finite intervals of the form $(a,b]$ by
$$\mu\big((a,b]\big)=F(b)-F(a)$$
extends uniquely to a measure $\mu_F$ on a $\sigma$-algebra $\mathcal{M}$ that included the Borel sets. Furthermore, if two such functions $F$ and $G$ induce the same measure, i.e. $\mu_F = \mu_G$, then $F-G$ is constant. Conversely, if $\mu$ is a measure on Borel subsets of the real line that is finite on compact sets, then the function $F_\mu:\mathbb{R}\to\mathbb{R}$ defined by
$$F_\mu(t)= \begin{cases} \mu((0,t]) & \text{if } t\geq 0 \\ -\mu((t,0]) & \text{if } t < 0\end{cases}$$
is a nondecreasing right-continuous function with $F(0)=0$ such that $\mu_{F_\mu}=\mu$.

This particular distribution function is well defined whether $\mu$ is finite or infinite; for this reason, a few authors also refer to $F_{\mu}$ as a distribution function of the measure $\mu$. That is:

Definition 3: Given the measure space $(\mathbb{R},\mathcal{B}(\mathbb{R}),\mu)$, if $\mu$ is finite on compact sets, then the nondecreasing right-continuous function $F_\mu$ with $F_\mu(0)=0$ such that
$$\mu\big((a,b]) = F_\mu(b)-F_\mu(a)$$
is called the canonical distribution function associated to $\mu$.

== Example ==
As the measure, choose the Lebesgue measure $\lambda$. Then by Definition of $\lambda$
$$\lambda((0,t])=t-0=t \text{ and } -\lambda((t,0])=-(0-t)=t$$
Therefore, the distribution function of the Lebesgue measure is
$$F_\lambda(t)=t$$
for all $t \in \R$.

== Comments ==
- The distribution function $d_f$ of a real-valued measurable function $f$ on a measure space $(X,\mathcal{B},\mu)$ is a monotone nonincreasing function, and it is supported on $[0,\mu(X)]$. If $d_f(s_0)<\infty$ for some $s_0\geq0$, then
  $$\lim_{s\to\infty} d_f(s) = 0.$$
- When the underlying measure $\mu$ on $(\mathbb{R},\mathcal{B}(\mathbb{R}))$ is finite, the distribution function $F$ in Definition 3 differs slightly from the standard definition of the distribution function $F_\mu$ (in the sense of probability theory) as given by Definition 2 in that for the former, $F(0)=0$ while for the latter,
  $$\lim_{t \to - \infty} F_\mu(t)=0 \text{ and } \lim_{t \to  \infty} F_\mu(t)=\mu(\mathbb{R}).$$
- When the objects of interest are measures in $(\mathbb{R},\mathcal{B}(\mathbb{R}))$, Definition 3 is more useful for infinite measures. This is the case because $\mu((- \infty, t])=\infty$ for all $t\in\mathbb{R}$, which renders the notion in Definition 2 useless.
