= Kinetic theory of gases =

Understanding of gas properties in terms of molecular motion

The temperature of the ideal gas is proportional to the average kinetic energy of its particles. The size of helium atoms relative to their spacing is shown to scale under 1,950 atmospheres of pressure. The atoms have an average speed relative to their size slowed down here two trillion fold from that at room temperature.

The kinetic theory of gases is a simple classical model of the thermodynamic behavior of gases. Its introduction allowed many principal concepts of thermodynamics to be established. It treats a gas as composed of numerous particles, too small to be seen with a microscope, in constant, random motion. These particles are now known to be the atoms or molecules of the gas. The kinetic theory of gases uses their collisions with each other and with the walls of their container to explain the relationship between the macroscopic properties of gases, such as volume, pressure, and temperature, as well as transport properties such as viscosity, thermal conductivity and mass diffusivity.

The basic version of the model describes an ideal gas. It treats the collisions as perfectly elastic and as the only interaction between the particles, which are additionally assumed to be much smaller than their average distance apart.

Due to the time reversibility of microscopic dynamics (microscopic reversibility), the kinetic theory is also connected to the principle of detailed balance, in terms of the fluctuation-dissipation theorem (for Brownian motion) and the Onsager reciprocal relations.

The theory was historically significant as the first explicit exercise of the ideas of statistical mechanics and it forms the theoretical foundation for rarefied gas dynamics.

== History ==
=== Kinetic theory of matter ===
==== Antiquity ====
In about 50 BC, the Roman philosopher Lucretius proposed that apparently static macroscopic bodies were composed on a small scale of rapidly moving atoms all bouncing off each other. This Epicurean atomistic point of view was rarely considered in the subsequent centuries, when Aristotelian ideas were dominant.

==== Modern era ====
===== "Heat is motion" =====
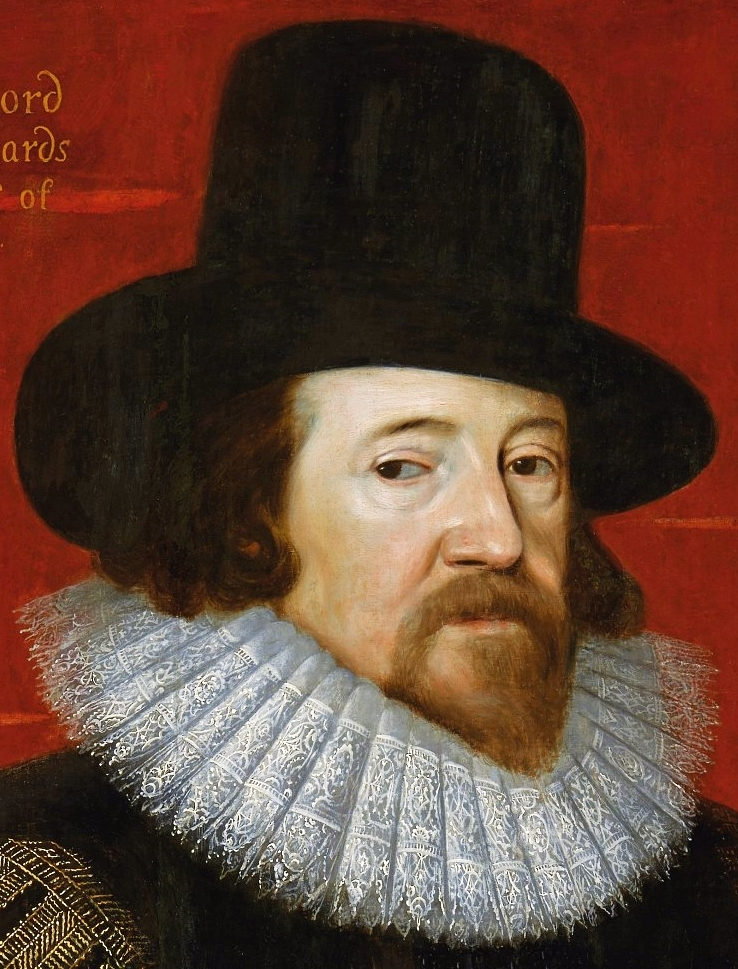
Francis Bacon

One of the first and boldest statements on the relationship between motion of particles and heat was by the English philosopher Francis Bacon in 1620. "It must not be thought that heat generates motion, or motion heat (though in some respects this be true), but that the very essence of heat ... is motion and nothing else." "not a ... motion of the whole, but of the small particles of the body." In 1623, in The Assayer, Galileo Galilei, in turn, argued that heat, pressure, smell and other phenomena perceived by our senses are apparent properties only, caused by the movement of particles, which is a real phenomenon.

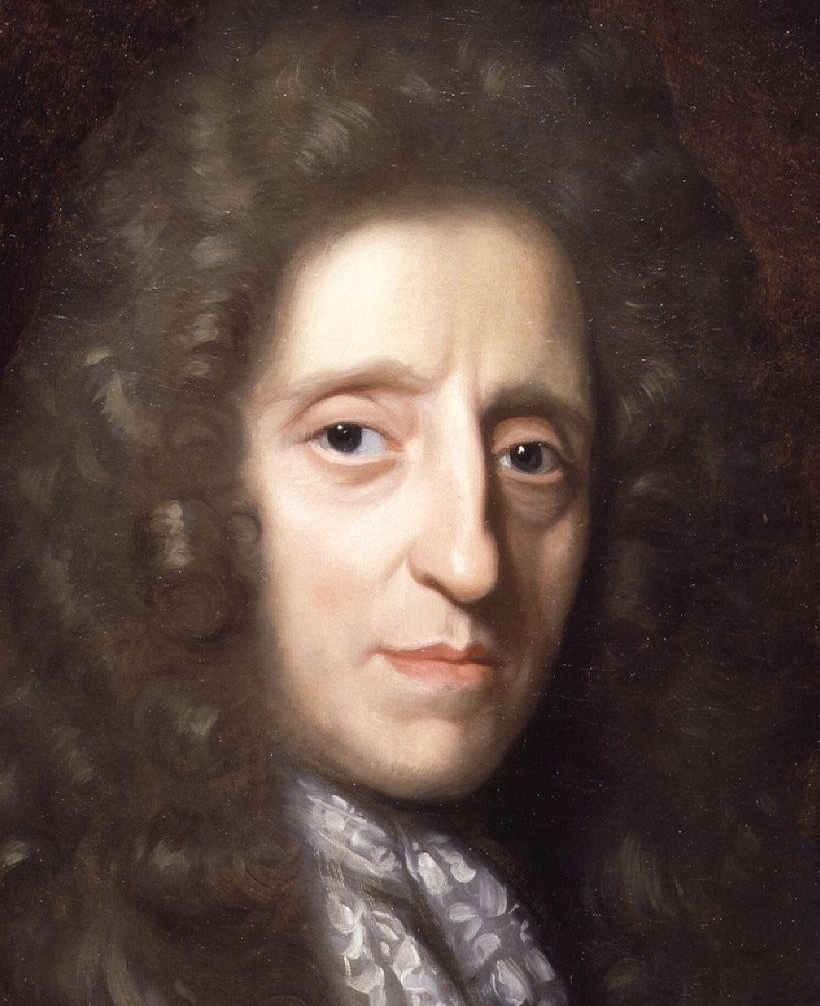
John Locke

In 1665, in Micrographia, the English polymath Robert Hooke repeated Bacon's assertion, and in 1675, his colleague, Anglo-Irish scientist Robert Boyle noted that a hammer's "impulse" is transformed into the motion of a nail's constituent particles, and that this type of motion is what heat consists of. Boyle also believed that all macroscopic properties, including color, taste and elasticity, are caused by and ultimately consist of nothing but the arrangement and motion of indivisible particles of matter. In a lecture of 1681, Hooke asserted a direct relationship between the temperature of an object and the speed of its internal particles. "Heat ... is nothing but the internal Motion of the Particles of [a] Body; and the hotter a Body is, the more violently are the Particles moved." In a manuscript published 1720, the English philosopher John Locke made a very similar statement: "What in our sensation is heat, in the object is nothing but motion." Locke too talked about the motion of the internal particles of the object, which he referred to as its "insensible parts".

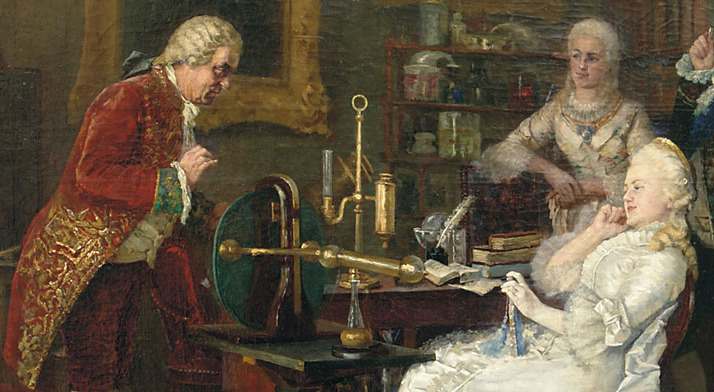
Catherine the Great visiting Mikhail Lomonosov

In his 1744 paper Meditations on the Cause of Heat and Cold, Russian polymath Mikhail Lomonosov made a relatable appeal to everyday experience to gain acceptance of the microscopic and kinetic nature of matter and heat:

Movement should not be denied based on the fact it is not seen. Who would deny that the leaves of trees move when rustled by a wind, despite it being unobservable from large distances? Just as in this case motion remains hidden due to perspective, it remains hidden in warm bodies due to the extremely small sizes of the moving particles. In both cases, the viewing angle is so small that neither the object nor their movement can be seen.

Lomonosov also insisted that movement of particles is necessary for the processes of dissolution, extraction and diffusion, providing as examples the dissolution and diffusion of salts by the action of water particles on the “molecules of salt”, the dissolution of metals in mercury, and the extraction of plant pigments by alcohol.

Also the transfer of heat was explained by the motion of particles. Around 1760, Scottish physicist and chemist Joseph Black wrote: "Many have supposed that heat is a tremulous ... motion of the particles of matter, which ... motion they imagined to be communicated from one body to another."

=== Kinetic theory of gases ===
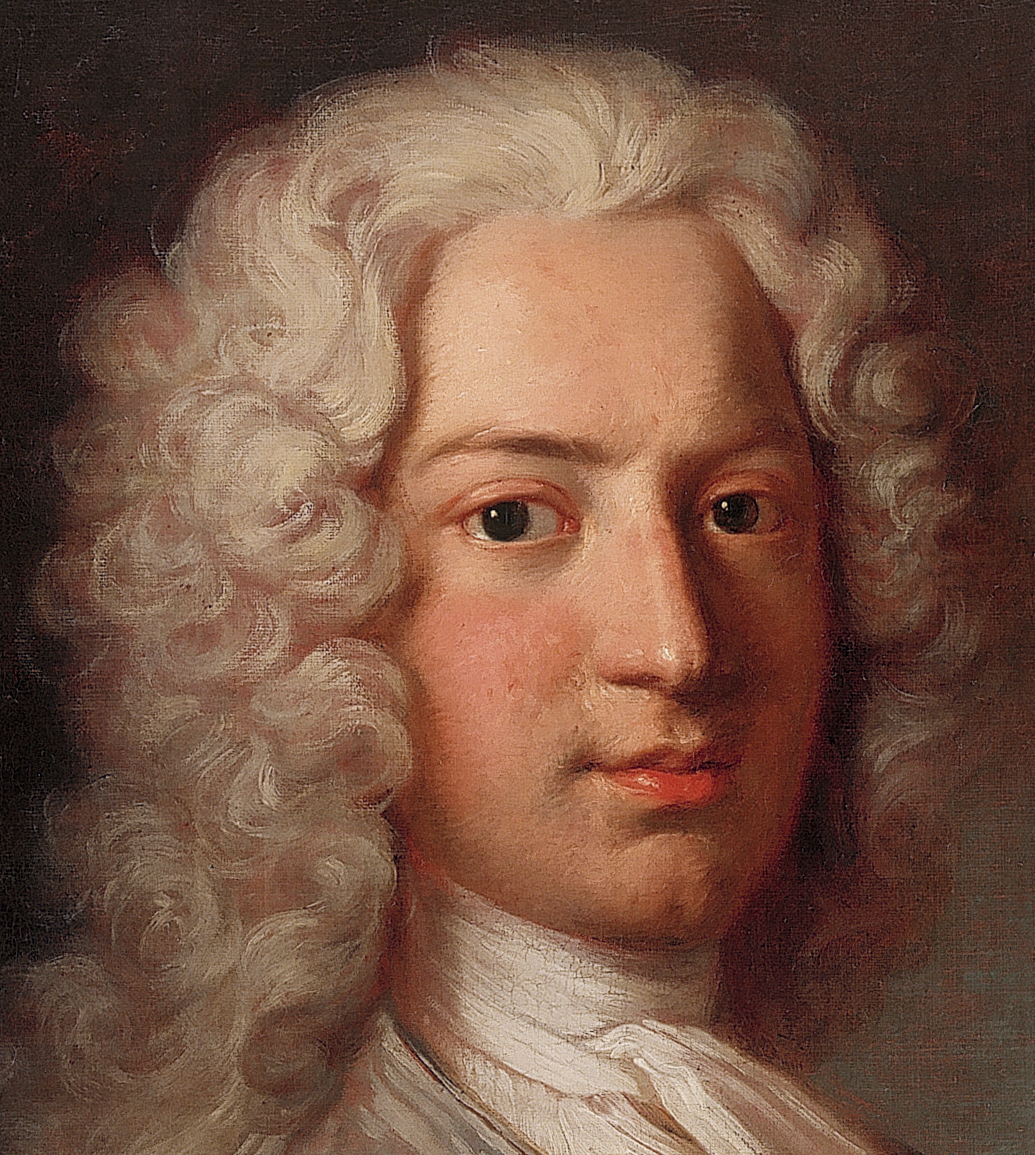
Daniel Bernoulli

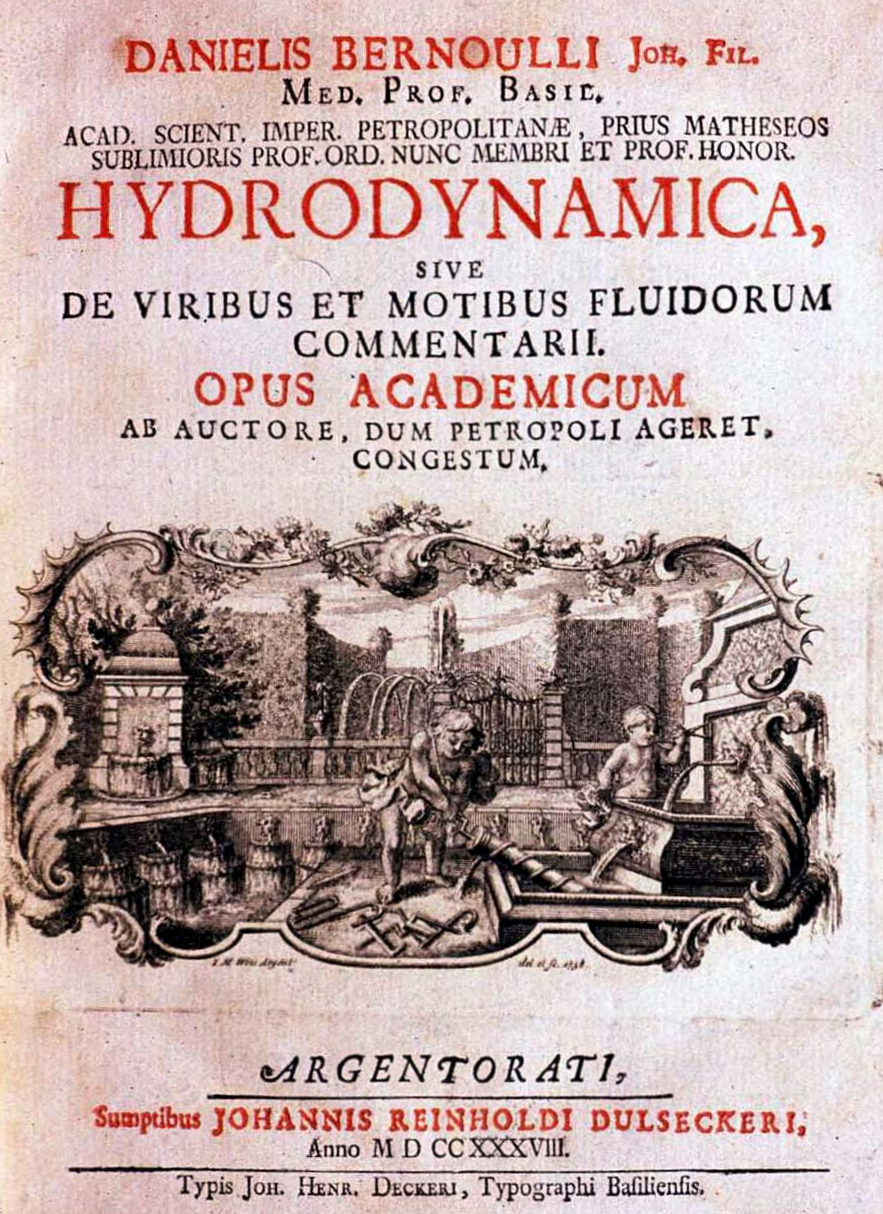
Hydrodynamica front cover

In 1738 Daniel Bernoulli published Hydrodynamica, which laid the basis for the kinetic theory of gases. In this work, Bernoulli posited the argument, that gases consist of great numbers of molecules moving in all directions, that their impact on a surface causes the pressure of the gas, and that their average kinetic energy determines the temperature of the gas. The theory was not immediately accepted, in part because conservation of energy had not yet been established, and it was not obvious to physicists how the collisions between molecules could be perfectly elastic.

Pioneers of the kinetic theory, whose work was also largely neglected by their contemporaries, were Mikhail Lomonosov (1747), Georges-Louis Le Sage (ca. 1780, published 1818), John Herapath (1816) and John James Waterston (1843), which connected their research with the development of mechanical explanations of gravitation.

In 1856 August Krönig created a simple gas-kinetic model, which only considered the translational motion of the particles. In 1857 Rudolf Clausius developed a similar, but more sophisticated version of the theory, which included translational and, contrary to Krönig, also rotational and vibrational molecular motions. In this same work he introduced the concept of mean free path of a particle. In 1859, after reading a paper about the diffusion of molecules by Clausius, Scottish physicist James Clerk Maxwell formulated the Maxwell distribution of molecular velocities, which gave the proportion of molecules having a certain velocity in a specific range. This was the first-ever statistical law in physics. Maxwell also gave the first mechanical argument that molecular collisions entail an equalization of temperatures and hence a tendency towards equilibrium. In his 1873 thirteen page article 'Molecules', Maxwell states: "we are told that an 'atom' is a material point, invested and surrounded by 'potential forces' and that when 'flying molecules' strike against a solid body in constant succession it causes what is called pressure of air and other gases." In 1871, Ludwig Boltzmann generalized Maxwell's achievement and formulated the Maxwell–Boltzmann distribution. The logarithmic connection between entropy and probability was also first stated by Boltzmann.

At the beginning of the 20th century, atoms were considered by many physicists to be purely hypothetical constructs, rather than real objects. An important turning point was Albert Einstein's (1905) and Marian Smoluchowski's (1906) papers on Brownian motion, which succeeded in making certain accurate quantitative predictions based on the kinetic theory.

Following the development of the Boltzmann equation, a framework for its use in developing transport equations was developed independently by David Enskog and Sydney Chapman in 1917 and 1916. The framework provided a route to prediction of the transport properties of dilute gases, and became known as Chapman–Enskog theory. The framework was gradually expanded throughout the following century, eventually becoming a route to prediction of transport properties in real, dense gases.

== Assumptions ==
The application of kinetic theory to ideal gases makes the following assumptions:

- The gas consists of very small particles. This smallness of their size is such that the sum of the volume of the individual gas molecules is negligible compared to the volume of the container of the gas. This is equivalent to stating that the average distance separating the gas particles is large compared to their size, and that the elapsed time during a collision between particles and the container's wall is negligible when compared to the time between successive collisions.
- The number of particles is so large that a statistical treatment of the problem is well justified. This assumption is sometimes referred to as the thermodynamic limit.
- The rapidly moving particles constantly collide among themselves and with the walls of the container, and all these collisions are perfectly elastic.
- Interactions (i.e. collisions) between particles are strictly binary and uncorrelated, meaning that there are no three-body (or higher) interactions, and the particles have no memory.
- Except during collisions, the interactions among molecules are negligible. They exert no other forces on one another.

Thus, the dynamics of particle motion can be treated classically, and the equations of motion are time-reversible.

As a simplifying assumption, the particles are usually assumed to have the same mass as one another; however, the theory can be generalized to a mass distribution, with each mass type contributing to the gas properties independently of one another in agreement with Dalton's law of partial pressures. Many of the model's predictions are the same whether or not collisions between particles are included, so they are often neglected as a simplifying assumption in derivations (see below).

More modern developments, such as the revised Enskog theory and the extended Bhatnagar–Gross–Krook model, relax one or more of the above assumptions. These can accurately describe the properties of dense gases, and gases with internal degrees of freedom, because they include the volume of the particles as well as contributions from intermolecular and intramolecular forces as well as quantized molecular rotations, quantum rotational-vibrational symmetry effects, and electronic excitation. While theories relaxing the assumptions that the gas particles occupy negligible volume and that collisions are strictly elastic have been successful, it has been shown that relaxing the requirement of interactions being binary and uncorrelated will eventually lead to divergent results.

== Equilibrium properties ==
=== Pressure and kinetic energy ===
In the kinetic theory of gases, the pressure is assumed to be equal to the force (per unit area) exerted by the individual gas atoms or molecules hitting and rebounding from the gas container's surface.

Consider a gas particle traveling at velocity, $v_i$, along the $\hat{i}$-direction in an enclosed volume with characteristic length, $L_i$, cross-sectional area, $A_i$, and volume, $V = A_i L_i$. The gas particle encounters a boundary after characteristic time
$$t = L_i / v_i.$$

The momentum of the gas particle can then be described as
$$p_i = m v_i = m L_i / t .$$

We combine the above with Newton's second law, which states that the force experienced by a particle is related to the time rate of change of its momentum, such that
$$F_i = \frac{\mathrm{d}p_i}{\mathrm{d}t} = \frac{m L_i}{t^2}=\frac{m v_i^2}{L_i}.$$

Now consider a large number, $N$, of gas particles with random orientation in a three-dimensional volume. Because the orientation is random, the average particle speed, $v$, in every direction is identical
$$v_x^2 = v_y^2 = v_z^2.$$

Further, assume that the volume is symmetrical about its three dimensions, $\hat{i}, \hat{j}, \hat{k}$, such that
$$\begin{align}
V ={}& V_i = V_j = V_k, \\
F ={}& F_i = F_j = F_k, \\
& A_i=A_j=A_k.
\end{align}$$
The total surface area on which the gas particles act is therefore
$$A = 3 A_i.$$

The pressure exerted by the collisions of the $N$ gas particles with the surface can then be found by adding the force contribution of every particle and dividing by the interior surface area of the volume,
$$P = \frac{N \overline{F}}{A}=\frac{NLF}{V}$$
$$\Rightarrow PV = NLF = \frac{N}{3} m v^2.$$

The total translational kinetic energy $K_\text{t}$ of the gas is defined as
$$K_\text{t} = \frac{N}{2} m v^2 ,$$
providing the result
$$PV = \frac{2}{3} K_\text{t} .$$

This is an important, non-trivial result of the kinetic theory because it relates pressure, a macroscopic property, to the translational kinetic energy of the molecules, which is a microscopic property.

The mass density of a gas $\rho$ is expressed through the total mass of gas particles and through volume of this gas: $\rho = \frac {N m}{V}$. Taking this into account, the pressure is equal to
$$P = \frac{\rho v^2}{3} .$$

Relativistic expression for this formula is

$$P = \frac {2 \rho c^2 }{3} \left({\left(1 - \overline{v^2} / c^2\right)}^{-1/2} - 1 \right) ,$$
where $c$ is speed of light. In the limit of small speeds, the expression becomes $P \approx \rho \overline{v^2}/3$.

=== Temperature and kinetic energy ===
Rewriting the above result for the pressure as $PV = \frac{1}{3}Nmv^2$, we may combine it with the ideal gas law

$$PV = N k_\mathrm{B} T ,$$	1

where $k_\mathrm{B}$ is the Boltzmann constant and $T$ is the absolute temperature defined by the ideal gas law, to obtain
$$k_\mathrm{B} T = \frac{1}{3} m v^2,$$
which leads to a simplified expression of the average translational kinetic energy per molecule,
$$\frac{1}{2} m v^2 = \frac{3}{2} k_\mathrm{B} T.$$
The translational kinetic energy of the system is $N$ times that of a molecule, namely $K_\text{t} = \frac{1}{2} N m v^2$. The temperature, $T$ is related to the translational kinetic energy by the description above, resulting in

$$T = \frac{1}{3} \frac{m v^2}{k_\mathrm{B} }$$	2

which becomes

$$T = \frac{2}{3} \frac{K_\text{t}}{N k_\mathrm{B} }.$$	3

Equation (3) is one important result of the kinetic theory: The average molecular kinetic energy is proportional to the ideal gas law's absolute temperature. From equations (1) and (3), we have

$$PV = \frac{2}{3} K_\text{t}.$$	4

Thus, the product of pressure and volume per mole is proportional to the average translational molecular kinetic energy.

Equations (1) and (4) are called the "classical results", which could also be derived from statistical mechanics; for more details, see:

The equipartition theorem requires that kinetic energy is partitioned equally between all kinetic degrees of freedom, D. A monatomic gas is axially symmetric about each spatial axis, so that D = 3 comprising translational motion along each axis. A diatomic gas is axially symmetric about only one axis, so that D = 5, comprising translational motion along three axes and rotational motion along two axes. A polyatomic gas, like water, is not radially symmetric about any axis, resulting in D = 6, comprising 3 translational and 3 rotational degrees of freedom.

Because the equipartition theorem requires that kinetic energy is partitioned equally, the total kinetic energy is
$$K =D K_\text{t} = \frac{D}{2} N m v^2.$$

Thus, the energy added to the system per gas particle kinetic degree of freedom is
$$\frac{K}{ND} = \frac{1}{2} k_\text{B} T .$$

Therefore, the kinetic energy per kelvin of one mole of monatomic ideal gas (D = 3) is
$$K = \frac{D}{2} k_\text{B} N_\text{A} = \frac{3}{2} R,$$
where $N_\text{A}$ is the Avogadro constant, and R is the ideal gas constant.

Thus, the ratio of the kinetic energy to the absolute temperature of an ideal monatomic gas can be calculated easily:

- per mole: 12.47 J/K
- per molecule: 20.7 yJ/K = 129 μeV/K

At standard temperature (273.15 K), the kinetic energy can also be obtained:

- per mole: 3406 J
- per molecule: 5.65 zJ = 35.2 meV.

At higher temperatures (typically thousands of kelvins), vibrational modes become active to provide additional degrees of freedom, creating a temperature-dependence on D and the total molecular energy. Quantum statistical mechanics is needed to accurately compute these contributions.

=== Collisions with container wall ===
For an ideal gas in equilibrium, the rate of collisions with the container wall and velocity distribution of particles hitting the container wall can be calculated based on naive kinetic theory, and the results can be used for analyzing effusive flow rates, which is useful in applications such as the gaseous diffusion method for isotope separation.

Assume that in the container, the number density (number per unit volume) is $n = N/V$ and that the particles obey Maxwell's velocity distribution:
$$f_\text{Maxwell}(v_x,v_y,v_z) \, dv_x \, dv_y \, dv_z = \left(\frac{m}{2 \pi k_\text{B} T}\right)^{3/2} e^{- \frac{mv^2}{2k_\text{B}T}} \, dv_x \, dv_y \, dv_z$$

Then for a small area $dA$ on the container wall, a particle with speed $v$ at angle $\theta$ from the normal of the area $dA$, will collide with the area within time interval $dt$, if it is within the distance $v\,dt$ from the area $dA$. Therefore, all the particles with speed $v$ at angle $\theta$ from the normal that can reach area $dA$ within time interval $dt$ are contained in the tilted pipe with a height of $v\cos (\theta) dt$ and a volume of $v\cos (\theta) \,dA\,dt$.

The total number of particles that reach area $dA$ within time interval $dt$ also depends on the velocity distribution; All in all, it calculates to be:
$$n v \cos(\theta) \, dA\, dt \times\left(\frac{m}{2 \pi k_\text{B}T}\right)^{3/2} e^{- \frac{mv^2}{2k_\text{B}T}} \left( v^2 \sin(\theta) \, dv \, d\theta \, d\phi \right).$$

Integrating this over all appropriate velocities within the constraint $v > 0$, $0 < \theta < \frac{\pi}{2}$, $0 < \phi < 2\pi$ yields the number of atomic or molecular collisions with a wall of a container per unit area per unit time:
$$J_\text{collision} = \frac{\displaystyle\int_0^{\pi/2} \cos(\theta) \sin(\theta) \, d\theta}{\displaystyle\int_0^\pi \sin(\theta) \, d\theta}\times n \bar v
= \frac{1}{4} n \bar v
= \frac{n}{4} \sqrt{\frac{8 k_\mathrm{B} T}{\pi m}}.$$

This quantity is also known as the "impingement rate" in vacuum physics. Note that to calculate the average speed $\bar{v}$ of the Maxwell's velocity distribution, one has to integrate over $v > 0$, $0 < \theta < \pi$, $0 < \phi < 2\pi$.

The momentum transfer to the container wall from particles hitting the area $dA$ with speed $v$ at angle $\theta$ from the normal, in time interval $dt$ is:
$$[2mv \cos(\theta)]\times n v \cos(\theta) \, dA\, dt \times\left(\frac{m}{2 \pi k_\text{B}T}\right)^{3/2} e^{- \frac{mv^2}{2k_\text{B}T}} \left( v^2 \sin(\theta) \, dv \, d\theta \, d\phi \right).$$
Integrating this over all appropriate velocities within the constraint $v > 0$, $0 < \theta < \frac{\pi}{2}$, $0 < \phi < 2\pi$ yields the pressure (consistent with Ideal gas law):
$$P = \frac{\displaystyle 2\int_0^{\pi/2} \cos^2(\theta) \sin(\theta) \, d\theta}{\displaystyle \int_0^\pi \sin(\theta) \, d\theta}\times n mv_\text{rms}^2
= \frac{1}{3} n mv_\text{rms}^2
= \frac{2}{3} n\langle E_\text{kin}\rangle
= n k_\mathrm{B} T$$
If this small area $A$ is punched to become a small hole, the effusive flow rate will be:
$$\Phi_\text{effusion} = J_\text{collision} A= n A \sqrt{\frac{k_\mathrm{B} T}{2 \pi m}}.$$

Combined with the ideal gas law, this yields
$$\Phi_\text{effusion} = \frac{P A}{\sqrt{2 \pi m k_\mathrm{B} T}}.$$

The above expression is consistent with Graham's law.

To calculate the velocity distribution of particles hitting this small area, we must take into account that all the particles with $(v,\theta,\phi)$ that hit the area $dA$ within the time interval $dt$ are contained in the tilted pipe with a height of $v\cos (\theta) \, dt$ and a volume of $v\cos (\theta) \, dA \, dt$; Therefore, compared to the Maxwell distribution, the velocity distribution will have an extra factor of $v\cos \theta$:
$$\begin{align}
f(v,\theta,\phi) \, dv \, d\theta \, d\phi
&= \lambda v\cos{\theta} \left(\frac{m}{2 \pi k T}\right)^{3/2} e^{- \frac{mv^2}{2k_\mathrm{B} T}}(v^2\sin{\theta} \, dv \, d\theta \, d\phi)
\end{align}$$
with the constraint $v > 0$, $0 < \theta < \frac{\pi}{2}$, $0 < \phi < 2\pi$. The constant $\lambda$ can be determined by the normalization condition $\int f(v,\theta,\phi) \, dv \, d\theta \, d\phi=1$ to be $4/\bar{v}$, and overall:
$$\begin{align}
f(v,\theta,\phi) \, dv \, d\theta \, d\phi
&= \frac{1}{2\pi} \left(\frac{m}{k_\mathrm{B} T}\right)^2e^{- \frac{mv^2}{2k_\mathrm{B} T}}
(v^3\sin{\theta}\cos{\theta} \, dv \, d\theta \, d\phi) \\
\end{align};\quad v>0,\, 0<\theta<\frac \pi 2,\, 0<\phi<2\pi$$

=== Speed of molecules ===
From the kinetic energy formula it can be shown that
$$v_\text{p} = \sqrt{2 \cdot \frac{k_\mathrm{B} T}{m}},$$
$$\bar{v} = \frac {2}{\sqrt{\pi}} v_p = \sqrt{\frac {8}{\pi} \cdot \frac{k_\mathrm{B} T}{m}},$$
$$v_\text{rms} = \sqrt{\frac{3}{2}} v_p = \sqrt{{3} \cdot \frac {k_\mathrm{B} T}{m}},$$
where v is in m/s, T is in kelvin, and m is the mass of one molecule of gas in kg. The most probable (or mode) speed $v_\text{p}$ is 81.6% of the root-mean-square speed $v_\text{rms}$, and the mean (arithmetic mean, or average) speed $\bar{v}$ is 92.1% of the rms speed (isotropic distribution of speeds).

See:

- Average,
- Root-mean-square speed
- Arithmetic mean
- Mean
- Mode (statistics)

=== Mean free path ===
In kinetic theory of gases, the mean free path is the average distance traveled by a molecule, or a number of molecules per volume, before they make their first collision. Let $\sigma$ be the collision cross section of one molecule colliding with another. As in the previous section, the number density $n$ is defined as the number of molecules per (extensive) volume, or $n = N/V$. The collision cross section per volume or collision cross section density is $n \sigma$, and it is related to the mean free path $\ell$ by
$$\ell = \frac {1} {n \sigma \sqrt{2}}$$

Notice that the unit of the collision cross section per volume $n \sigma$ is reciprocal of length.

== Transport properties ==
The kinetic theory of gases deals not only with gases in thermodynamic equilibrium, but also very importantly with gases not in thermodynamic equilibrium. This means using Kinetic Theory to consider what are known as "transport properties", such as viscosity, thermal conductivity, mass diffusivity and thermal diffusion.

In its most basic form, kinetic gas theory is only applicable to dilute gases. The extension of kinetic gas theory to dense gas mixtures, Revised Enskog Theory, was developed in 1983–1987 by E. G. D. Cohen, J. M. Kincaid and M. Lòpez de Haro, building on work by H. van Beijeren and M. H. Ernst.

=== Viscosity and kinetic momentum ===
In books on elementary kinetic theory one can find results for dilute gas modeling that are used in many fields. Derivation of the kinetic model for shear viscosity usually starts by considering a Couette flow where two parallel plates are separated by a gas layer. The upper plate is moving at a constant velocity to the right due to a force F. The lower plate is stationary, and an equal and opposite force must therefore be acting on it to keep it at rest. The molecules in the gas layer have a forward velocity component $u$ which increase uniformly with distance $y$ above the lower plate. The non-equilibrium flow is superimposed on a Maxwell-Boltzmann equilibrium distribution of molecular motions.

Inside a dilute gas in a Couette flow setup, let $u_0$ be the forward velocity of the gas at a horizontal flat layer (labeled as $y=0$); $u_0$ is along the horizontal direction. The number of molecules arriving at the area $dA$ on one side of the gas layer, with speed $v$ at angle $\theta$ from the normal, in time interval $dt$ is
$$nv\cos({\theta})\, dA \, dt \times \left(\frac{m}{2 \pi k_\mathrm{B} T}\right)^{3/2} \, e^{- \frac{mv^2}{2 k_\mathrm{B} T}} (v^2\sin{\theta} \, dv \, d\theta \, d\phi)$$

These molecules made their last collision at $y = \pm \ell\cos \theta$, where $\ell$ is the mean free path. Each molecule will contribute a forward momentum of
$$p_x^{\pm} = m \left( u_0 \pm \ell \cos \theta \frac{du}{dy} \right),$$
where plus sign applies to molecules from above, and minus sign below. Note that the forward velocity gradient $du/dy$ can be considered to be constant over a distance of mean free path.

Integrating over all appropriate velocities within the constraint $v > 0$, $0 < \theta < \frac{\pi}{2}$, $0 < \phi < 2\pi$ yields the forward momentum transfer per unit time per unit area (also known as shear stress):
$$\tau^{\pm} = \frac{1}{4} \bar{v} n \cdot m \left( u_0 \pm \frac{2}{3} \ell \frac{du}{dy} \right)$$

The net rate of momentum per unit area that is transported across the imaginary surface is thus
$$\tau = \tau^{+} - \tau^{-} = \frac {1}{3} \bar v n m \cdot \ell \frac{du}{dy}$$

Combining the above kinetic equation with Newton's law of viscosity
$$\tau = \eta \frac{du}{dy}$$
gives the equation for shear viscosity, which is usually denoted $\eta_0$ when it is a dilute gas:
$$\eta_0 = \frac{1}{3} \bar{v} n m \ell$$

Combining this equation with the equation for mean free path gives
$$\eta_0 = \frac {1} {3 \sqrt{2}} \frac{m \bar{v}}{\sigma}$$

Maxwell-Boltzmann distribution gives the average (equilibrium) molecular speed as
$$\bar v = \frac{2}{\sqrt{\pi}} v_p = 2 \sqrt{\frac{2}{\pi} \frac {k_\mathrm{B}T}{m}}$$
where $v_p$ is the most probable speed. We note that
$$k_\text{B} N_\text{A} = R \quad \text{and} \quad M = m N_\text{A}$$

and insert the velocity in the viscosity equation above. This gives the well known equation (with $\sigma$ subsequently estimated below) for shear viscosity for dilute gases:
$$\eta_0
= \frac {2} {3 \sqrt{\pi} } \cdot \frac {\sqrt{m k_\mathrm{B} T}} { \sigma }
= \frac {2} {3 \sqrt{\pi} } \cdot \frac {\sqrt{M R T}} { \sigma N_\text{A} }$$
and $M$ is the molar mass. The equation above presupposes that the gas density is low (i.e. the pressure is low). This implies that the transport of momentum through the gas due to the translational motion of molecules is much larger than the transport due to momentum being transferred between molecules during collisions. The transfer of momentum between molecules is explicitly accounted for in Revised Enskog theory, which relaxes the requirement of a gas being dilute. The viscosity equation further presupposes that there is only one type of gas molecules, and that the gas molecules are perfect elastic and hard core particles of spherical shape. This assumption of elastic, hard core spherical molecules, like billiard balls, implies that the collision cross section of one molecule can be estimated by
$$\sigma = \pi \left( 2 r \right)^2 = \pi d^2$$

The radius $r$ is called collision cross section radius or kinetic radius, and the diameter $d$ is called collision cross section diameter or kinetic diameter of a molecule in a monomolecular gas. There are no simple general relation between the collision cross section and the hard core size of the (fairly spherical) molecule. The relation depends on shape of the potential energy of the molecule. For a real spherical molecule (i.e. a noble gas atom or a reasonably spherical molecule) the interaction potential is more like the Lennard-Jones potential or Morse potential which have a negative part that attracts the other molecule from distances longer than the hard core radius. The radius for zero Lennard-Jones potential may then be used as a rough estimate for the kinetic radius. However, using this estimate will typically lead to an erroneous temperature dependency of the viscosity. For such interaction potentials, significantly more accurate results are obtained by numerical evaluation of the required collision integrals.

The expression for viscosity obtained from Revised Enskog Theory reduces to the above expression in the limit of infinite dilution, and can be written as
$$\eta = (1 + \alpha_\eta)\eta_0 + \eta_c$$
where $\alpha_\eta$ is a term that tends to zero in the limit of infinite dilution that accounts for excluded volume, and $\eta_c$ is a term accounting for the transfer of momentum over a non-zero distance between particles during a collision.

=== Thermal conductivity and heat flux ===
Following a similar logic as above, one can derive the kinetic model for thermal conductivity of a dilute gas:

Consider two parallel plates separated by a gas layer. Both plates have uniform temperatures, and are so massive compared to the gas layer that they can be treated as thermal reservoirs. The upper plate has a higher temperature than the lower plate. The molecules in the gas layer have a molecular kinetic energy $\varepsilon$ which increases uniformly with distance $y$ above the lower plate. The non-equilibrium energy flow is superimposed on a Maxwell-Boltzmann equilibrium distribution of molecular motions.

Let $\varepsilon_0$ be the molecular kinetic energy of the gas at an imaginary horizontal surface inside the gas layer. The number of molecules arriving at an area $dA$ on one side of the gas layer, with speed $v$ at angle $\theta$ from the normal, in time interval $dt$ is
$$nv \cos(\theta)\, dA \, dt \times \left(\frac{m}{2 \pi k_\mathrm{B}T}\right)^{3 / 2} e^{- \frac{mv^2}{2k_\text{B}T}} (v^2 \sin(\theta) \, dv \, d\theta \, d\phi)$$

These molecules made their last collision at a distance $\ell\cos \theta$ above and below the gas layer, and each will contribute a molecular kinetic energy of
$$\varepsilon^{\pm} = \left( \varepsilon_0 \pm m c_v \ell \cos \theta \, \frac{dT}{dy} \right),$$
where $c_v$ is the specific heat capacity. Again, plus sign applies to molecules from above, and minus sign below. Note that the temperature gradient $dT/dy$ can be considered to be constant over a distance of mean free path.

Integrating over all appropriate velocities within the constraint $v > 0$, $0 < \theta < \frac{\pi}{2}$, $0 < \phi < 2\pi$ yields the energy transfer per unit time per unit area (also known as heat flux):
$$q_y^{\pm} = -\frac{1}{4} \bar v n \cdot \left( \varepsilon_0 \pm \frac {2}{3} m c_v \ell \frac{dT}{dy} \right)$$

Note that the energy transfer from above is in the $-y$ direction, and therefore the overall minus sign in the equation. The net heat flux across the imaginary surface is thus
$$q = q_y^{+} - q_y^{-} = -\frac{1}{3} \bar{v} n m c_v \ell \,\frac{dT}{dy}$$

Combining the above kinetic equation with Fourier's law
$$q = -\kappa \, \frac{dT}{dy}$$
gives the equation for thermal conductivity, which is usually denoted $\kappa_0$ when it is a dilute gas:
$$\kappa_0 = \frac{1}{3} \bar{v} n m c_v \ell$$

Similarly to viscosity, Revised Enskog theory yields an expression for thermal conductivity that reduces to the above expression in the limit of infinite dilution, and which can be written as
$$\kappa = \alpha_\kappa \kappa_0 + \kappa_c$$
where $\alpha_\kappa$ is a term that tends to unity in the limit of infinite dilution, accounting for excluded volume, and $\kappa_c$ is a term accounting for the transfer of energy across a non-zero distance between particles during a collision.

=== Diffusion coefficient and diffusion flux ===
Following a similar logic as above, one can derive the kinetic model for mass diffusivity of a dilute gas:

Consider a steady diffusion between two regions of the same gas with perfectly flat and parallel boundaries separated by a layer of the same gas. Both regions have uniform number densities, but the upper region has a higher number density than the lower region. In the steady state, the number density at any point is constant (that is, independent of time). However, the number density $n$ in the layer increases uniformly with distance $y$ above the lower plate. The non-equilibrium molecular flow is superimposed on a Maxwell–Boltzmann equilibrium distribution of molecular motions.

Let $n_0$ be the number density of the gas at an imaginary horizontal surface inside the layer. The number of molecules arriving at an area $dA$ on one side of the gas layer, with speed $v$ at angle $\theta$ from the normal, in time interval $dt$ is
$$nv\cos(\theta) \, dA \, dt \times \left(\frac{m}{2 \pi k_\mathrm{B}T}\right)^{3 / 2} e^{- \frac{mv^2}{2k_\text{B}T}} (v^2\sin(\theta) \, dv\, d\theta \, d\phi)$$

These molecules made their last collision at a distance $\ell\cos \theta$ above and below the gas layer, where the local number density is
$$n^{\pm} = \left( n_0 \pm \ell \cos \theta \, \frac{dn}{dy} \right)$$

Again, plus sign applies to molecules from above, and minus sign below. Note that the number density gradient $dn/dy$ can be considered to be constant over a distance of mean free path.

Integrating over all appropriate velocities within the constraint $v > 0$, $0 < \theta < \frac{\pi}{2}$, $0 < \phi < 2\pi$ yields the molecular transfer per unit time per unit area (also known as diffusion flux):
$$J_y^{\pm} = - \frac{1}{4} \bar v \cdot \left( n_0 \pm \frac{2}{3} \ell \, \frac{dn}{dy} \right)$$

Note that the molecular transfer from above is in the $-y$ direction, and therefore the overall minus sign in the equation. The net diffusion flux across the imaginary surface is thus
$$J = J_y^{+} - J_y^{-} = -\frac {1}{3} \bar{v} \ell \frac{dn}{dy}$$

Combining the above kinetic equation with Fick's first law of diffusion
$$J = - D \frac{dn}{dy}$$
gives the equation for mass diffusivity, which is usually denoted $D_0$ when it is a dilute gas:
$$D_0 = \frac{1}{3} \bar{v} \ell$$

The corresponding expression obtained from Revised Enskog Theory may be written as
$$D = \alpha_D D_0$$
where $\alpha_D$ is a factor that tends to unity in the limit of infinite dilution, which accounts for excluded volume and the variation chemical potentials with density.

== Detailed balance ==
=== Fluctuation and dissipation ===
The kinetic theory of gases entails that due to the microscopic reversibility of the gas particles' detailed dynamics, the system must obey the principle of detailed balance. Specifically, the fluctuation-dissipation theorem applies to the Brownian motion (or diffusion) and the drag force, which leads to the Einstein–Smoluchowski equation:
$$D = \mu \, k_\text{B} T,$$
where

- D is the mass diffusivity;
- μ is the "mobility", or the ratio of the particle's terminal drift velocity to an applied force, μ = v_{d}/F;
- k_{B} is the Boltzmann constant;
- T is the absolute temperature.

Note that the mobility μ = v_{d}/F can be calculated based on the viscosity of the gas; Therefore, the Einstein–Smoluchowski equation also provides a relation between the mass diffusivity and the viscosity of the gas.

=== Onsager reciprocal relations ===
The mathematical similarities between the expressions for shear viscosity, thermal conductivity and diffusion coefficient of the ideal (dilute) gas is not a coincidence; It is a direct result of the Onsager reciprocal relations (i.e. the detailed balance of the reversible dynamics of the particles), when applied to the convection (matter flow due to temperature gradient, and heat flow due to pressure gradient) and advection (matter flow due to the velocity of particles, and momentum transfer due to pressure gradient) of the ideal (dilute) gas.

== See also ==
- Bogoliubov-Born-Green-Kirkwood-Yvon hierarchy of equations
- Boltzmann equation
- Chapman–Enskog theory
- Collision theory
- Critical temperature
- Gas laws
- Heat
- Interatomic potential
- Magnetohydrodynamics
- Maxwell–Boltzmann distribution
- Mixmaster universe
- Thermodynamics
- Vicsek model
- Vlasov equation
