= Haynes–Shockley experiment =

In semiconductor physics, the Haynes–Shockley experiment was an experiment that demonstrated that diffusion of minority carriers in a semiconductor could result in a current. The experiment was reported in a short paper by Haynes and Shockley in 1948, with a more detailed version published by Shockley, Pearson, and Haynes in 1949. The experiment can be used to measure carrier mobility, carrier lifetime, and diffusion coefficient.

In the experiment, a piece of semiconductor gets a pulse of holes, for example, as induced by voltage or a short laser pulse.

== Equations ==
To see the effect, we consider a n-type semiconductor with the length d. We are interested in determining the mobility of the carriers, diffusion constant and relaxation time. In the following, we reduce the problem to one dimension.

The equations for electron and hole currents are:

$$j_e=+\mu_n n E+D_n \frac{\partial n}{\partial x}$$

$$j_p=+\mu_p p E-D_p \frac{\partial p}{\partial x}$$

where the js are the current densities of electrons (e) and holes (p), the μs the charge carrier mobilities, E is the electric field, n and p the number densities of charge carriers, the Ds are diffusion coefficients, and x is position. The first term of the equations is the drift current, and the second term is the diffusion current.

== Derivation ==
We consider the continuity equation:

$$\frac{\partial n}{\partial t}=\frac{-(n-n_0)}{\tau_n}+\frac{\partial j_e}{\partial x}$$

$$\frac{\partial p}{\partial t}=\frac{-(p-p_0)}{\tau_p}-\frac{\partial j_p}{\partial x}$$

Subscript 0s indicate equilibrium concentrations. The electrons and the holes recombine with the carrier lifetime τ.

We define

$$p_1=p-p_0\,,\quad n_1=n-n_0$$

so the upper equations can be rewritten as:

$$\frac{\partial p_1}{\partial t}=D_p \frac{\partial^2 p_1}{\partial x^2}-\mu_p p \frac{\partial E}{\partial x}-
\mu_p E \frac{\partial p_1}{\partial x}-\frac{p_1}{\tau_p}$$
$$\frac{\partial n_1}{\partial t}=D_n \frac{\partial^2 n_1}{\partial x^2}+\mu_n n \frac{\partial E}{\partial x}+
\mu_n E \frac{\partial n_1}{\partial x}-\frac{n_1}{\tau_n}$$

In a simple approximation, we can consider the electric field to be constant between the left and right electrodes and neglect ∂E/∂x. However, as electrons and holes diffuse at different speeds, the material has a local electric charge, inducing an inhomogeneous electric field which can be calculated with Gauss's law:

$$\frac{\partial E}{\partial x}= \frac{\rho}{\epsilon \epsilon_0}=\frac{e_0 ((p-p_0)-(n-n_0))}{\epsilon \epsilon_0} = \frac{e_0 (p_1-n_1)}{\epsilon \epsilon_0}$$

where ε is permittivity, ε_{0} the permittivity of free space, ρ is charge density, and e_{0} elementary charge.

Next, change variables by the substitutions:

$$p_1 = n_\text{mean}+\delta\,,\quad n_1 = n_\text{mean}-\delta\,,$$

and suppose δ to be much smaller than $n_\text{mean}$. The two initial equations write:

$$\frac{\partial n_\text{mean}}{\partial t}=D_p \frac{\partial^2 n_\text{mean}}{\partial x^2}-\mu_p p \frac{\partial E}{\partial x}-
\mu_p E \frac{\partial n_\text{mean}}{\partial x}-\frac{n_\text{mean}}{\tau_p}$$

$$\frac{\partial n_\text{mean}}{\partial t}=D_n \frac{\partial^2 n_\text{mean}}{\partial x^2}+\mu_n n \frac{\partial E}{\partial x}+
\mu_n E \frac{\partial n_\text{mean}}{\partial x}-\frac{n_\text{mean}}{\tau_n}$$

Using the Einstein relation $\mu=e\beta D$, where β is the inverse of the product of temperature and the Boltzmann constant, these two equations can be combined:

$$\frac{\partial n_\text{mean}}{\partial t}=D^* \frac{\partial^2 n_\text{mean}}{\partial x^2}-
\mu^* E \frac{\partial n_\text{mean}}{\partial x}-\frac{n_\text{mean}}{\tau^*},$$

where for D*, μ* and τ* holds:

$D^*=\frac{D_n D_p(n+p)}{p D_p+nD_n}$, $\mu^*=\frac{\mu_n\mu_p(n-p)}{p\mu_p+n\mu_n}$ and $\frac{1}{\tau^*}=\frac{p\mu_p\tau_p+n\mu_n\tau_n}{\tau_p\tau_n(p\mu_p+n\mu_n)}.$

Considering n >> p or p → 0 (that is a fair approximation for a semiconductor with only few holes injected), we see that D* → D_{p}, μ* → μ_{p} and 1/τ* → 1/τ_{p}. The semiconductor behaves as if there were only holes traveling in it.

The final equation for the carriers is:

$$n_\text{mean}(x,t)=A \frac{1}{\sqrt{4\pi D^* t}} e^{-t/\tau^*} e^{-\frac{(x+\mu^*Et-x_0)^2}{4D^*t}}$$

This can be interpreted as a Dirac delta function that is created immediately after the pulse. Holes then start to travel towards the electrode where we detect them. The signal then is Gaussian curve shaped.

Parameters μ, Dσ and τ can be obtained from the shape of the signal.

$$\mu^*=\frac{d}{E t_0}$$

$$D^*=(\mu^* E)^2 \frac{(\delta t)^2}{16 ln(2) t_0}$$

where d is the distance drifted in time t_{0}, and δt the pulse width.

== See also ==
- Alternating current
- Conduction band
- Convection–diffusion equation
- Direct current
- Drift current
- Free electron model
- Random walk
