= Parrondo =

Parrondo is a surname. Notable people with the name include:

- Gil Parrondo (1921–2016), Spanish art director, set decorator and production designer
- J. M. R. Parrondo (born 1964), Spanish physicist

- Parrondo's paradox (also Parrondo's games) a paradox in game theory created by him

- Roberto García Parrondo (born 1980), Spanish team handball player
