= Einstein's constant =

"Einstein's constant" might mean:

- Cosmological constant
- Einstein gravitational constant in the Einstein field equations
- Einstein relation (kinetic theory), diffusion coefficient
- Speed of light in vacuum
