= Oreste Piro =

Argentine biophysicist

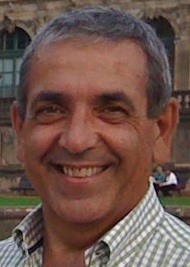
- Oreste Piro
- Born: 1954 (age 71–72); Tres Arroyos, Argentina
- Citizenship: Argentinean, Spanish
- Education: Universidad Nacional de La Plata
- Known for: PiroGon relaxation oscillator, dynamics of chaotic advection, bailout embedding, vertebrate left-right asymmetry, self-tuned critical network model
- Scientific career
- Fields: dynamical systems, biophysics
- Workplaces: Universitat de les Illes Balears
- Doctoral advisor: Huner Fanchiotti
- Other academic advisors: Leo P. Kadanoff
- Notable students: Marcelo Magnasco

Oreste Piro is a dynamical systems theorist and biophysicist. He is at the Universitat de les Illes Balears (UIB) in Palma de Mallorca.

Piro is known for work including his studies of forced relaxation oscillators such as the exactly-solvable PiroGon oscillator, the dynamics of passive scalars in chaotic advection of fluids, bailout embeddings, the influence of fluid mechanics on the development of vertebrate left-right asymmetry, and the self-tuned critical network model
