= Marcelo Osvaldo Magnasco =

Argentine biophysicist

- Born: December 14, 1963 (age 62); La Plata, Argentina
- Citizenship: Argentina, United States
- Education: University of Chicago
- Known for: Thermal ratchet, Auditory Physiology, dating the Odyssey
- Awards: University of Chicago’s Sydney Bloomenthal Dissertation Fellow, William Rainey Harper Dissertation-year Fellow
- Scientific career
- Fields: Theoretical neuroscience
- Workplaces: Rockefeller University, International Centre for Theoretical Physics
- Doctoral advisor: Leo P. Kadanoff
- Other academic advisors: Oreste Piro; Mitchell J. Feigenbaum; Albert J. Libchaber

Marcelo Osvaldo Magnasco is a biophysicist and a professor at Rockefeller University.

== Career ==
He is known for his work on thermal ratchets as models of biological motors, auditory biophysics, bailout embeddings, neural coding, other studies of biological networks such as leaf venation, and for placing the date of the solar eclipse mentioned in the Odyssey on April 16, 1178 B.C. together with Constantino Baikouzis of the National University of La Plata.

In 2013, Magnasco formed the m^{2}c^{2} collaboration with cetacean researcher Diana Reiss in order to study marine mammal communication and cognition. Their interdisciplinary team is probing dolphin intelligence using an underwater interactive touchpad at the National Aquarium (Baltimore).
