= Convection–diffusion equation =

Combination of the diffusion and convection (advection) equations

The convection–diffusion equation is a parabolic partial differential equation that combines the diffusion and convection (advection) equations. It describes physical phenomena where particles, energy, or other physical quantities are transferred inside a physical system due to two processes: diffusion and convection. Depending on context, the same equation can be called the advection–diffusion equation, drift–diffusion equation, or (generic) scalar transport equation.

== Equation ==
A contaminant plume moving in porous media via the convection–diffusion equation (also called advective–diffusion equation) (time stamps of 1 day, 85 days, 462 days and 674 days) with advection as primary transport mechanism.

The general equation in conservative form is
$$\frac{\partial c}{\partial t}  = \nabla \cdot \left(D \nabla c - \mathbf{v} c\right) + R$$
where

- c is the variable of interest (species concentration for mass transfer, temperature for heat transfer),
- D is the diffusivity (also called diffusion coefficient), such as mass diffusivity for particle motion or thermal diffusivity for heat transport,
- v is the velocity field that the quantity is moving with. It is a function of time and space. For example, in advection, c might be the concentration of salt in a river, and then v would be the velocity of the water flow as a function of time and location. Another example, c might be the concentration of small bubbles in a calm lake, and then v would be the velocity of bubbles rising towards the surface by buoyancy (see below) depending on time and location of the bubble. For multiphase flows and flows in porous media, v is the (hypothetical) superficial velocity.
- R describes sources or sinks of the quantity c, i.e. the creation or destruction of the quantity. For example, for a chemical species, R > 0 means that a chemical reaction is creating more of the species, and R < 0 means that a chemical reaction is destroying the species. For heat transport, R > 0 might occur if thermal energy is being generated by friction.
- ∇ represents gradient and ∇ ⋅ represents divergence. In this equation, ∇c represents concentration gradient.

In general, D, v, and R may vary with space and time. In cases in which they depend on concentration as well, the equation becomes nonlinear, giving rise to many distinctive mixing phenomena such as Rayleigh–Bénard convection when v depends on temperature in the heat transfer formulation and reaction–diffusion pattern formation when R depends on concentration in the mass transfer formulation.

Often there are several quantities, each with its own convection–diffusion equation, where the destruction of one quantity entails the creation of another. For example, when methane burns, it involves not only the destruction of methane and oxygen but also the creation of carbon dioxide and water vapor. Therefore, while each of these chemicals has its own convection–diffusion equation, they are coupled together and must be solved as a system of differential equations.

=== Derivation ===
The convection–diffusion equation can be derived in a straightforward way from the continuity equation, which states that the rate of change for a scalar quantity in a differential control volume is given by flow and diffusion into and out of that part of the system along with any generation or consumption inside the control volume:
$$\frac{\partial c}{\partial t} + \nabla\cdot\mathbf{j} = R,$$
where j is the total flux and R is a net volumetric source for c. There are two sources of flux in this situation. First, diffusive flux arises due to diffusion. This is typically approximated by Fick's first law:
$$\mathbf{j}_\text{diff} = -D \nabla c$$
i.e., the flux of the diffusing material (relative to the bulk motion) in any part of the system is proportional to the local concentration gradient. Second, when there is overall convection or flow, there is an associated flux called advective flux:
$$\mathbf{j}_\text{adv} = \mathbf{v} c$$
The total flux (in a stationary coordinate system) is given by the sum of these two:
$$\mathbf{j} = \mathbf{j}_\text{diff} + \mathbf{j}_\text{adv} = -D \nabla c + \mathbf{v} c.$$
Plugging into the continuity equation:
$$\frac{\partial c}{\partial t} + \nabla\cdot \left(-D \nabla c + \mathbf{v} c \right) = R.$$

=== Common simplifications ===
In a common situation, the diffusion coefficient is constant, there are no sources or sinks, and the velocity field describes an incompressible flow (i.e., it has zero divergence). Then the formula simplifies to:
$$\frac{\partial c}{\partial t}  = D \nabla^2 c - \mathbf{v} \cdot \nabla c.$$

In this case the equation can be put in the simple diffusion form:
$$\frac{d c}{d t}  = D \nabla^2 c,$$

where the derivative of the left hand side is the material derivative of the variable c. In non-interacting material, D=0 (for example, when temperature is close to absolute zero, dilute gas has almost zero mass diffusivity), hence the transport equation is simply the continuity equation:
$$\frac{\partial c}{\partial t}  + \mathbf{v} \cdot \nabla c=0.$$

Using Fourier transform in both temporal and spatial domain (that is, with integral kernel $e^{i\omega t+i\mathbf{k}\cdot\mathbf{x}}$), its characteristic equation can be obtained:
$$i\omega \tilde c+\mathbf{v}\cdot i \mathbf{k} \tilde c=0 \rightarrow
\omega = -\mathbf{k}\cdot \mathbf{v},$$
which gives the general solution:
$$c = f(\mathbf{x}-\mathbf{v}t),$$
where $f$ is any differentiable scalar function. This is the basis of temperature measurement for near Bose–Einstein condensate via time of flight method.

=== Stationary version ===
The stationary convection–diffusion equation describes the steady-state behavior of a convection–diffusion system. In a steady state, ∂c/∂t = 0, so the equation to solve becomes the second order equation:
$$\nabla \cdot (- D \nabla c + \mathbf{v} c) = R.$$
In one spatial dimension, the equation can be written as
$$\frac d {dx} \left(- D(x) \frac {dc(x)}{dx} + v(x) c(x) \right) = R(x)$$

Which can be integrated one time in the space variable x to give:

$$D(x) \frac {dc(x)}{dx} - v(x) c(x) = - \int_x R(x') dx'$$

Where D is not zero, this is an inhomogeneous first-order linear differential equation with variable coefficients in the variable c(x):

$$y'(x) = f(x) y(x) + g(x).$$
where the coefficients are:
$$f(x) = \frac{v(x)}{D(x)}$$
and:
$$g(x) = - \frac 1 {D(x)} \int_x R(x') \, dx'$$
On the other hand, in the positions x where D=0, the first-order diffusion term disappears and the solution becomes simply the ratio:

$$c(x) = \frac 1 {v(x)} \int_x R(x') \, dx'$$

== Velocity in response to a force ==
In some cases, the average velocity field v exists because of a force; for example, the equation might describe the flow of ions dissolved in a liquid, with an electric field pulling the ions in some direction (as in gel electrophoresis). In this situation, it is usually called the drift–diffusion equation or the Smoluchowski equation, after Marian Smoluchowski who described it in 1915 (not to be confused with the Einstein–Smoluchowski relation or Smoluchowski coagulation equation).

Typically, the average velocity is directly proportional to the applied force, giving the equation:
$$\frac{\partial c}{\partial t}  = \nabla \cdot (D \nabla c) - \nabla \cdot \left( \zeta^{-1} \mathbf{F} c \right) + R$$
where F is the force, and ζ characterizes the friction or viscous drag. (The inverse ζ^{−1} is called mobility.)

=== Derivation of Einstein relation ===
When the force is associated with a potential energy F = −∇U (see conservative force), a steady-state solution to the above equation (i.e. 0 = R = ∂c/∂t) is:
$$c \propto \exp \left( -D^{-1} \zeta^{-1} U \right)$$
(assuming D and ζ are constant). In other words, there are more particles where the energy is lower. This concentration profile is expected to agree with the Boltzmann distribution (more precisely, the Gibbs measure). From this assumption, the Einstein relation can be proven:
$$D \zeta = k_\mathrm{B} T.$$

== Similar equations in other contexts ==
The convection–diffusion equation is a relatively simple equation describing flows, or alternatively, describing a stochastically-changing system. Therefore, the same or similar equation arises in many contexts unrelated to flows through space.

- It is formally identical to the Fokker–Planck equation for the distribution of a particle.
- It is closely related to the Black–Scholes equation and other equations in financial mathematics.
- It is closely related to the Navier–Stokes equations, because the flow of momentum in a fluid is mathematically similar to the flow of mass or energy. The correspondence is clearest in the case of an incompressible Newtonian fluid, in which case the Navier–Stokes equation is:
  $$\frac{\partial \mathbf{j}}{\partial t} = \mu \nabla^2 \mathbf{j} -\mathbf{u} \cdot \nabla \mathbf{j} + (\mathbf{f} - \nabla P)$$

where j is the momentum of the fluid (per unit volume) at each point (equal to the density ρ multiplied by the flow velocity u), μ is viscosity, P is fluid pressure, and f is any other body force such as gravity. In this equation, the term on the left-hand side describes the change in momentum at a given point; the first term on the right describes the diffusion of momentum by viscosity; the second term on the right describes the advective flow of momentum; and the last two terms on the right describes the external and internal forces which can act as sources or sinks of momentum.

=== In probability theory ===
The convection–diffusion equation (with R = 0) can be viewed as the Fokker–Planck equation, corresponding to random motion with diffusivity D and bias v. For example, the equation can describe the Brownian motion of a single particle, where the variable c describes the probability distribution for the particle to be in a given position at a given time. The reason the equation can be used that way is because there is no mathematical difference between the probability distribution of a single particle, and the concentration profile of a collection of infinitely many particles (as long as the particles do not interact with each other).

The Langevin equation describes advection, diffusion, and other phenomena in an explicitly stochastic way. One of the simplest forms of the Langevin equation is when its "noise term" is Gaussian; in this case, the Langevin equation is exactly equivalent to the convection–diffusion equation. However, the Langevin equation is more general.

=== In semiconductor physics ===
As carriers are generated (green:electrons and purple:holes) due to light shining at the center of an intrinsic semiconductor, they diffuse towards two ends. Electrons have higher diffusion constant than holes leading to fewer excess electrons at the center as compared to holes.

In semiconductor physics, this equation is called the drift–diffusion equation. The word "drift" is related to drift current and drift velocity. The equation is normally written:
$$\begin{align}
\frac{\mathbf{J}_n}{-q} &= - D_n \nabla n - n \mu_n \mathbf{E} \\
\frac{\mathbf{J}_p}{q} &= - D_p \nabla p + p \mu_p \mathbf{E} \\
\frac{\partial n}{\partial t} &= -\nabla \cdot \frac{\mathbf{J}_n}{-q} + R \\
\frac{\partial p}{\partial t} &= -\nabla \cdot \frac{\mathbf{J}_p}{q} + R
\end{align}$$
where

- n and p are the concentrations (densities) of electrons and holes, respectively,
- q > 0 is the elementary charge,
- J_{n} and J_{p} are the electric currents due to electrons and holes respectively,
- J_{n}/(−q) and J_{p}/q are the corresponding "particle currents" of electrons and holes respectively,
- R represents carrier generation and recombination (R > 0 for generation of electron-hole pairs, R < 0 for recombination.)
- E is the electric field vector
- $\mu_n$ and $\mu_p$ are electron and hole mobility.

The diffusion coefficient and mobility are related by the Einstein relation as above:
$$\begin{align}
D_n &= \frac{\mu_n k_\mathrm{B} T}{q}, \\
D_p &= \frac{\mu_p k_\mathrm{B} T}{q},
\end{align}$$
where k_{B} is the Boltzmann constant and T is absolute temperature. The drift current and diffusion current refer separately to the two terms in the expressions for J, namely:
$$\begin{align}
\frac{\mathbf{J}_{n,\text{drift}}}{-q} &= - n \mu_n \mathbf{E}, \\
\frac{\mathbf{J}_{p,\text{drift}}}{q} &= p \mu_p \mathbf{E}, \\
\frac{\mathbf{J}_{n,\text{diff}}}{-q} &= - D_n \nabla n, \\
\frac{\mathbf{J}_{p,\text{diff}}}{q} &= - D_p \nabla p.
\end{align}$$

This equation can be solved together with Poisson's equation numerically.

An example of results of solving the drift diffusion equation is shown on the right. When light shines on the center of semiconductor, carriers are generated in the middle and diffuse towards two ends. The drift–diffusion equation is solved in this structure and electron density distribution is displayed in the figure. One can see the gradient of carrier from center towards two ends.

== See also ==
- Advanced Simulation Library
- Buckley–Leverett equation
- Burgers' equation
- Conservation equations
- Double diffusive convection
- Incompressible Navier–Stokes equations
- Natural convection
- Nernst–Planck equation
- Numerical solution of the convection–diffusion equation
- Reaction–diffusion system
