= Brownian ratchet =

Perpetual motion device

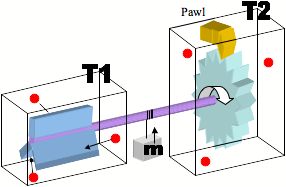
Schematic figure of a Brownian ratchet

In the philosophy of thermal and statistical physics, the Brownian ratchet or Feynman–Smoluchowski ratchet is an apparent perpetual motion machine of the second kind (converting thermal energy into mechanical work), first analysed in 1912 as a thought experiment by Polish physicist Marian Smoluchowski. It was popularised by American Nobel laureate physicist Richard Feynman in a physics lecture at the California Institute of Technology on May 11, 1962, during his Messenger Lectures series The Character of Physical Law in Cornell University in 1964 and in his text The Feynman Lectures on Physics as an illustration of the laws of thermodynamics. The simple machine, consisting of a tiny paddle wheel and a ratchet, appears to be an example of a Maxwell's demon, able to extract mechanical work from random fluctuations (heat) in a system at thermal equilibrium, in violation of the second law of thermodynamics. Detailed analysis by Feynman and others showed why it cannot actually do this.

== The machine ==
The device consists of a gear known as a ratchet that rotates freely in one direction but is prevented from rotating in the opposite direction by a pawl. The ratchet is connected by an axle to a paddle wheel that is immersed in a fluid of molecules at temperature $T_1$. The molecules constitute a heat bath in that they undergo random Brownian motion with a mean kinetic energy that is determined by the temperature. The device is imagined as being small enough that the impulse from a single molecular collision can turn the paddle. Although such collisions would tend to turn the rod in either direction with equal probability, the pawl allows the ratchet to rotate in one direction only. The net effect of many such random collisions would seem to be that the ratchet rotates continuously in that direction. The ratchet's motion then can be used to do work on other systems, for example lifting a weight (m) against gravity. The energy necessary to do this work apparently would come from the heat bath, without any heat gradient (i.e. the motion leeches energy from the temperature of the air). Were such a machine to work successfully, its operation would violate the second law of thermodynamics, one form of which states: "It is impossible for any device that operates on a cycle to receive heat from a single reservoir and produce a net amount of work."

== Why it fails ==
Although at first sight the Brownian ratchet seems to extract useful work from Brownian motion, Feynman demonstrated that if the entire device is at the same temperature, the ratchet will not rotate continuously in one direction but will move randomly back and forth, and therefore will not produce any useful work. The reason is that since the pawl is at the same temperature as the paddle, it will also undergo Brownian motion, "bouncing" up and down. It therefore will intermittently fail by allowing a ratchet tooth to slip backward under the pawl while it is up. Another issue is that when the pawl rests on the sloping face of the tooth, the spring which returns the pawl exerts a sideways force on the tooth which tends to rotate the ratchet in a backwards direction. Feynman demonstrated that if the temperature $T_2$ of the ratchet and pawl is the same as the temperature $T_1$ of the paddle, then the failure rate must equal the rate at which the ratchet ratchets forward, so that no net motion results over long enough periods or in an ensemble averaged sense. A simple but rigorous proof that no net motion occurs no matter what shape the teeth are was given by Magnasco.

If, on the other hand, $T_2$ is less than $T_1$, the ratchet will indeed move forward, and produce useful work. In this case, though, the energy is extracted from the temperature gradient between the two thermal reservoirs, and some waste heat is exhausted into the lower temperature reservoir by the pawl. In other words, the device functions as a miniature heat engine, in compliance with the second law of thermodynamics. Conversely, if $T_2$ is greater than $T_1$, the device will rotate in the opposite direction.

The Feynman ratchet model led to the similar concept of Brownian motors, nanomachines which can extract useful work not from thermal noise but from chemical potentials and other microscopic nonequilibrium sources, in compliance with the laws of thermodynamics. Diodes are an electrical analog of the ratchet and pawl, and for the same reason cannot produce useful work by rectifying Johnson noise in a circuit at uniform temperature.

Millonas as well as Mahato extended the same notion to correlation ratchets driven by mean-zero (unbiased) nonequilibrium noise with a nonvanishing correlation function of odd order greater than one.

== History ==
The ratchet and pawl was first discussed as a second law-violating device by Gabriel Lippmann in 1900. In 1912, Polish physicist Marian Smoluchowski gave the first correct qualitative explanation of why the device fails; thermal motion of the pawl allows the ratchet's teeth to slip backwards. Feynman did the first quantitative analysis of the device in 1962 using the Maxwell–Boltzmann distribution, showing that if the temperature of the paddle T_{1} was greater than the temperature of the ratchet T_{2}, it would function as a heat engine, but if T_{1} = T_{2} there would be no net motion of the paddle. In 1996, J. M. R. Parrondo and Pep Español used a variation of the above device in which no ratchet is present, only two paddles, to show that the axle connecting the paddles and ratchet conducts heat between reservoirs; they argued that although Feynman's conclusion was correct, his analysis was flawed because of his erroneous use of the quasistatic approximation, resulting in incorrect equations for efficiency. Marcelo Osvaldo Magnasco and Gustavo Stolovitzky (1998) extended this analysis to consider the full ratchet device, and showed that the power output of the device is far smaller than the Carnot efficiency claimed by Feynman. A paper in 2000 by Derek Abbott, Bruce R. Davis and Parrondo, reanalyzed the problem and extended it to the case of multiple ratchets, showing a link with Parrondo's paradox.

Brillouin paradox: an electrical analogue of the Brownian ratchet.

In 1950, Léon Brillouin discussed an electrical circuit analogue that uses a rectifier (such as a diode) instead of a ratchet. The idea was the diode would rectify the Johnson noise thermal current fluctuations produced by the resistor, generating a direct current which could be used to perform work. In the detailed analysis it was shown that the thermal fluctuations within the diode generate an electromotive force that cancels the voltage from rectified current fluctuations. Therefore, just as with the ratchet, the circuit will produce no useful energy if all the components are at thermal equilibrium (at the same temperature); a DC current will be produced only when the diode is at a lower temperature than the resistor.

== Granular gas ==
Researchers from the University of Twente, the University of Patras, and the Foundation for Fundamental Research on Matter have constructed a Feynman–Smoluchowski engine which, when not in thermal equilibrium, converts pseudo-Brownian motion into work by means of a granular gas, which is a conglomeration of solid particles vibrated with such vigour that the system assumes a gas-like state. The constructed engine consisted of four vanes which were allowed to rotate freely in a vibrofluidized granular gas. Because the ratchet's gear and pawl mechanism, as described above, permitted the axle to rotate only in one direction, random collisions with the moving beads caused the vane to rotate. This seems to contradict Feynman's hypothesis. However, this system is not in perfect thermal equilibrium: energy is constantly being supplied to maintain the fluid motion of the beads. Vigorous vibrations on top of a shaking device mimic the nature of a molecular gas. Unlike an ideal gas, though, in which tiny particles move constantly, stopping the shaking would simply cause the beads to drop. In the experiment, this necessary out-of-equilibrium environment was thus maintained. Work was not immediately being done, though; the ratchet effect only commenced beyond a critical shaking strength. For very strong shaking, the vanes of the paddle wheel interacted with the gas, forming a convection roll, sustaining their rotation.

== See also ==
- Quantum stirring, ratchets, and pumping
- Geometric phase § Stochastic pump effect
