= Current source density analysis =

Electric circuit model in neuroscience

In neuroscience, current source density analysis is the practice of placing a microelectrode in proximity to a nerve or a nerve cell to detect current sourcing from, or sinking into, its plasma membrane.

== Description ==
In electromagnetism, current sources and sinks refers to points, areas, or volumes through which electric current enters or exits a system. While current sources or sinks are abstract elements used for analysis, generally they have physical counterparts in real-world applications; e.g. the anode or cathode in a battery. In all cases, each of the opposing terms (source or sink) may refer to the same object, depending on the perspective of the observer and the sign convention being used; there is no intrinsic difference between a source and a sink.

When positive electric charges of dissolved ions, for example, flow quickly across a plasma membrane to the inside of a cell, this leaves behind a transient cloud of negativity in the vicinity of the cell exterior, a so-called "sink". This is because the flow of positive charges into the interior of the cell leaves behind uncompensated negative charges. A nearby microelectrode with substantial tip resistance (on the order of 1 MΩ) can detect that negativity because a voltage difference will develop across the tip of the electrode (between the negativity outside the electrode, and the electroneutral environment inside the electrode).

Put another way, the electrode internal solution will donate some of the positive charge needed to compensate the negativity caused by the current sink. Thus, the inside of the electrode will become negative relative to ground for as long as the extracellular negativity persists. The extracellular negativity, in turn, will persist as long as the current sink is present. Thus, by measuring a negativity relative to ground, the electrode indirectly reports the presence of a nearby current sink. The size of the recorded negativity will vary directly with the size of the current sink and inversely with the distance between the electrode and the sink.

The relationship between the sum of the current sources and sinks and the voltage measured by the microelectrode probe may be calculated analytically if it is assumed that the quasi-static assumption holds, that the medium is spherically symmetric, homogeneous, isotropic, and infinite, and if the current source or sink is modeled as a point source. The relationship is given by:

$$\Phi(r)={I \over 4 \pi r \sigma}$$

where $\Phi$ is the potential at radius $r$ from the source or sink, which passes current $I$ through a medium with conductivity $\sigma$.

== Neuroscience ==
Current sources and sinks have proven to be valuable in the study of brain function. Both have particular relevance in electrophysiology. Some special considerations are needed to apply these methods to brain tissue, where the electrical resistance is non-uniform. Two examples of the study of sources and sinks are electroencephalography (EEG) and current source density analysis (extracellular field potentials), but they have also provided enhancements in the spatio-temporal resolution of the EEG.

These methods have been used to enhance electroretinography. Recordings have identified how electrical fields develop and propagate across the retina.

In the brain, such recordings have been used to determine the spatial distribution of neural oscillations. Similarly, this has led to spatial resolution of neural coding in the inferior colliculus. It has also been used to study long-term potentiation in the hippocampus.

== See also ==
- Source–sink dynamics
