= Smoluchowski factor =

The Smoluchowski factor, also known as von Smoluchowski's f-factor, is related to inter-particle interactions. It is named after Marian Smoluchowski.

== See also ==
- Flocculation
- Smoluchowski coagulation equation
- Einstein–Smoluchowski relation
