= Smoluchowski coagulation equation =

Population balance equation in statistical physics

This diagram describes the aggregation kinetics of discrete particles according to the Smoluchowski aggregation equation.

In statistical physics, the Smoluchowski coagulation equation is a population balance equation introduced by Marian Smoluchowski in a seminal 1916 publication, describing the time evolution of the number density of particles as they coagulate (in this context "clumping together") to size x at time t.

Simultaneous coagulation (or aggregation) is encountered in processes involving polymerization, coalescence of aerosols, emulsication, flocculation.

== Equation ==
The distribution of particle size changes in time according to the interrelation of all particles of the system. Therefore, the Smoluchowski coagulation equation is an integrodifferential equation of the particle-size distribution. In the case when the sizes of the coagulated particles are continuous variables, the equation involves an integral:

$$\frac{\partial n(x,t)}{\partial t}=\frac{1}{2}\int^x_0K(x-y,y)n(x-y,t)n(y,t)\,dy - \int^\infty_0K(x,y)n(x,t)n(y,t)\,dy.$$

If dy is interpreted as a counting measure, i.e. when particles join in discrete sizes, then the discrete form of the equation is a summation:

$$\frac{\partial n(x_i,t)}{\partial t}=\frac{1}{2}\sum^{i-1}_{j=1}
K(x_i-x_j,x_j)n(x_i-x_j,t)n(x_j,t) - \sum^\infty_{j=1}K(x_i,x_j)n(x_i,t)n(x_j,t).$$

There exists a unique solution for a chosen kernel function.

== Coagulation kernel ==
The operator, K, is known as the coagulation kernel and describes the rate at which particles of size $x_1$ coagulate with particles of size $x_2$. Analytic solutions to the equation exist when the kernel takes one of three simple forms:

$$K = 1,\quad K = x_1 + x_2, \quad K = x_1x_2,$$

known as the constant, additive, and multiplicative kernels respectively. For the case $K = 1$ it could be mathematically proven that the solution of Smoluchowski coagulation equations have asymptotically the dynamic scaling property. This self-similar behaviour is closely related to scale invariance which can be a characteristic feature of a phase transition.

However, in most practical applications the kernel takes on a significantly more complex form. For example, the free-molecular kernel which describes collisions in a dilute gas-phase system,

$$K = \sqrt{\frac{\pi k_B T}{2}}\left(\frac{1}{m(x_1)}+\frac{1}{m(x_2)}\right)^{1/2}\left(d(x_1)+d(x_2)\right)^2.$$

Some coagulation kernels account for a specific fractal dimension of the clusters, as in the diffusion-limited aggregation:

$$K = \frac{2}{3} \frac{ k_B T} {\eta} \left(x_1^{1/y_1} +x_2^{1/y_2}\right)\left(x_1^{-1/y_1} +x_2^{-1/y_2}\right),$$

or Reaction-limited aggregation:

$$K = \frac{2}{3} \frac{ k_B T} {\eta} \frac{(x_1x_2)^\gamma}{W}\left(x_1^{1/y_1} +x_2^{1/y_2}\right)\left(x_1^{-1/y_1} +x_2^{-1/y_2}\right),$$

where $y_1,y_2$ are fractal dimensions of the clusters, $k_B$ is the Boltzmann constant, $T$ is the temperature, $W$ is the Fuchs stability ratio, $\eta$ is the continuous phase viscosity, and $\gamma$ is the exponent of the product kernel, usually considered a fitting parameter. For cloud, the kernel for coagulation of cloud particles are usually expressed as:

$$K = \pi [r(x_1)+r(x_2)]^2 |v(x_1)-v(x_2)| E_{coll}(x_1,x_2),$$

where $r(x)$ and $v(x)$ are the radius and fall speed of the cloud particles usually expressed using power law.

Generally the coagulation equations that result from such physically realistic kernels are not solvable, and as such, it is necessary to appeal to numerical methods. Most of deterministic methods can be used when there is only one particle property (x) of interest, the two principal ones being the method of moments and sectional methods. In the multi-variate case, however, when two or more properties (such as size, shape, composition, etc.) are introduced, one has to seek special approximation methods that suffer less from curse of dimensionality. Approximation based on Gaussian radial basis functions has been successfully applied to the coagulation equation in more than one dimension.

When the accuracy of the solution is not of primary importance, stochastic particle (Monte Carlo) methods are an attractive alternative. Through this method, to compute the coagulation rates for different coagulation events, the simulation entries are virtualized to be equally weighted. The accuracy of this transformation can be adjusted such that just those coagulation events are considered while keeping the number of simulation entries constant.

== See also ==
- Einstein–Smoluchowski relation
- Flocculation
- Smoluchowski factor
- Williams spray equation
- DLVO theory
- Marcus-Lushnikov process
