= Marian Smoluchowski =

Polish physicist (1872–1917)

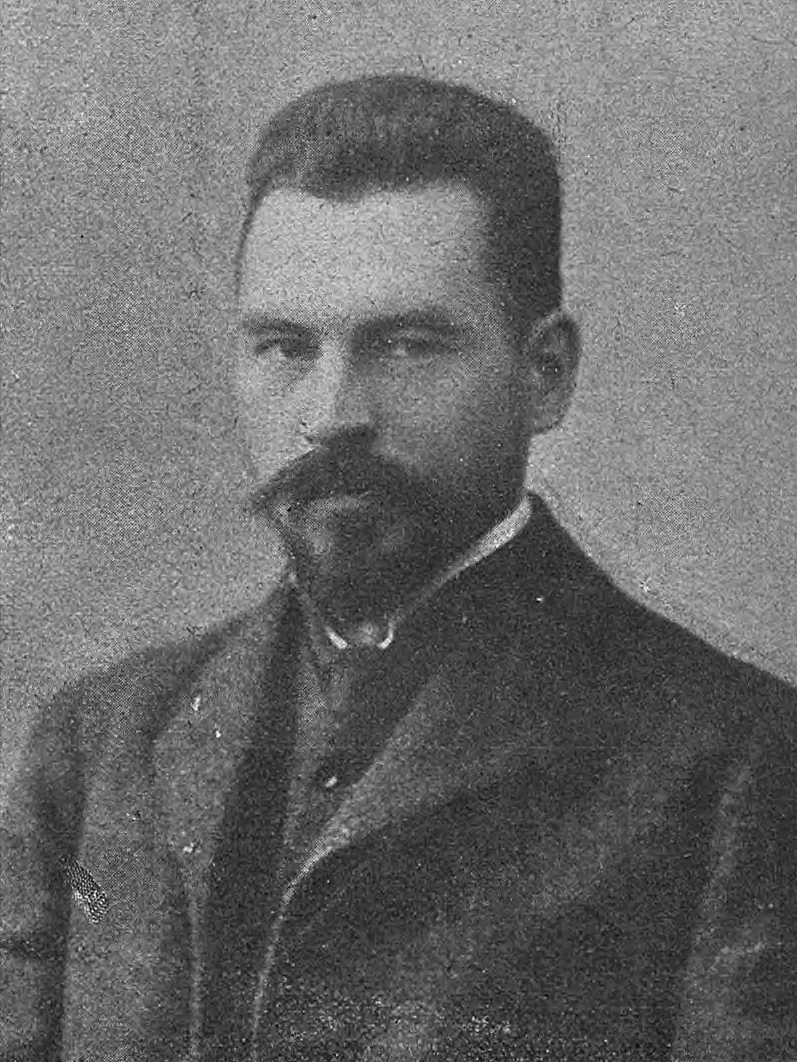
- Smoluchowski, c. 1913
- Born: 28 May 1872; Vorder-Brühl, Austria-Hungary
- Died: 5 September 1917 (aged 45); Kraków, Kingdom of Galicia and Lodomeria
- Education: University of Vienna
- Known for: Pioneering statistical physics Smoluchowski equation Smoluchowski coagulation equation Smoluchowski factor Einstein–Smoluchowski relation Feynman–Smoluchowski ratchet Helmholtz–Smoluchowski equation critical opalescence
- Awards: Haitinger Prize of the Vienna Academy of Sciences (1908); Order of Polonia Restituta (1936)
- Scientific career
- Fields: Physics
- Workplaces: University of Lviv; Jagellonian University
- Doctoral advisor: Franz S. Exner; Joseph Stefan
- Doctoral students: Józef Patkowski; Stanisław Loria; Wacław Dziewulski

Marian Smoluchowski (Polish: [ˈmarjan smɔluˈxɔfskʲi]; 28 May 1872 – 5 September 1917) was a Polish physicist who worked in the territories of the Austro-Hungarian Empire. He was a pioneer of statistical physics and made significant contributions to the theory of Brownian motion and stochastic processes.

Smoluchowski graduated in physics from the University of Vienna in 1895 before becoming a privatdozent at the University of Lemberg three years later. In 1913, he was appointed the chair of the Faculty of Experimental Physics at the Jagellonian University in Kraków. He is known for the Smoluchowski equation, Einstein–Smoluchowski relation and Feynman–Smoluchowski ratchet.

== Life ==
He was born in 1872 into an upper-class family in Vorder-Brühl, near Vienna, to father Wilhelm and mother Teofila (née Szczepanowska). He attended the prestigious Collegium Theresianum and subsequently studied physics at the University of Vienna (1890-95). In 1895, he obtained his doctorate based on his dissertation entitled Acoustical Studies of Elasticity of Soft Materials. His teachers included Franz S. Exner and Josef Stefan. Ludwig Boltzmann held a position at the Ludwig-Maximilians-Universität München during Smoluchowski's studies in Vienna, and Boltzmann returned to Vienna in 1894 when Smoluchowski was serving in the Austrian army. They apparently had no direct contact, although Smoluchowski's work follows in the tradition of Boltzmann's ideas.

After several years at other universities (Paris, Glasgow, Berlin), in 1899 Smoluchowski moved to Lwów (present-day Lviv). The following year, aged 28, Smoluchowski took a position of the chair of theoretical physics at the University of Lwów, becoming the youngest professor in Austria-Hungary. He was president of the Polish Copernicus Society of Naturalists, (1906–1907).

In 1913, Smoluchowski moved to Kraków to take over a chair in the Experimental Physics Department, succeeding August Witkowski, who had long envisioned Smoluchowski as his successor. When World War I began the following year, the work conditions became unusually difficult, as the spacious and modern Physics Department building, built by Witkowski a short time before, was turned into a military hospital. The possibility of working in that building had been one of the reasons Smoluchowski had decided to move to Kraków. Smoluchowski was now forced to work in the apartment of the late Professor Karol Olszewski. During his lectures in experimental physics, use of even the simplest demonstration equipment was virtually impossible.

Smoluchowski lectured in experimental physics; his students included Józef Patkowski, Stanisław Loria and Wacław Dziewulski.

Smoluchowski was a member of the Copernicus Society of Natural Scientists and the Polish Academy of Sciences and Letters.

Smoluchowski died in Kraków in 1917, as a result of a dysentery epidemic. Professor Władysław Natanson wrote in an obituary of Smoluchowski: "With great pleasure I recall the charm of his life, his noble cordiality, combined with exquisite kindness. I wish I could render the curious appeal of his personality, recall how temperate he was, how modest and elegantly diffident, yet always full of a pure, spontaneous joy."

== Work ==
Smoluchowski conducted fundamental research on the kinetic theory of matter. In 1904, he discovered density fluctuations in the gas phase, and in 1908 he was the first physicist to ascribe the phenomenon of critical opalescence to large density fluctuations. His investigations explained the blue color of the sky as a consequence of light scattering in the atmosphere. In the early 1900s, he also developed the most well known and widely used theory of electrophoresis.

In 1906, shortly after Albert Einstein, he independently explained Brownian motion. Smoluchowski presented an equation, known as the Smoluchowski equation, which became a basis for the theory of stochastic processes. It describes the time evolution of the probability density function for a particle undergoing Brownian motion under the influence of external forces and diffusion. Subrahmanyan Chandrasekhar described it as "one of the most outstanding achievements in molecular physics".

In 1916, he proposed the equation for diffusion in an external potential field. This equation bears his name.

== Personal life ==
In 1901, he had married Zofia Baraniecka (1881–1959), the daughter of Jagiellonian University Professor Marian Baraniecki. They had two children, Aldona Smoluchowska (1902–84) and Roman Smoluchowski (1910–96). Roman became a notable physicist who worked in Poland, and after World War II settled in the United States (the Institute for Advanced Study at Princeton).

His non-professional interests included skiing, mountain climbing in the Alps and the Tatra Mountains, watercolor painting, and playing the piano.

== Awards and recognition ==
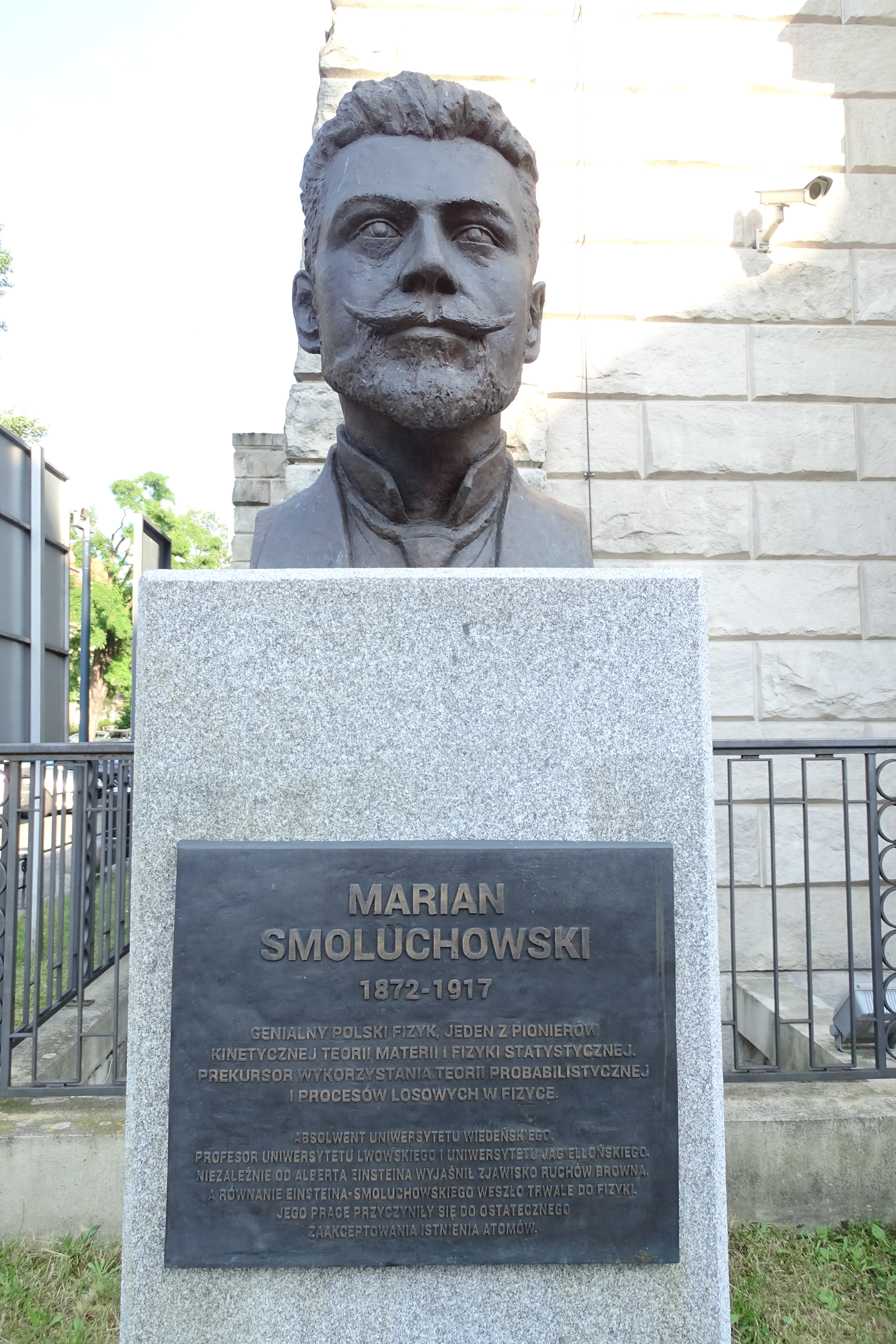
Marian Smoluchowski's bust at the University of Wrocław, Poland.

In 1901, he received an honorary doctorate from the University of Glasgow. In 1908, he was awarded the Haitinger Prize of the Austrian Academy of Sciences for his theoretical explanation of Brownian motion. In 1913, he was the Wolfskehl Foundation lecturer at Göttingen. In 1936, he was posthumously awarded the Commander's Cross of the Order of Polonia Restituta.

In 1965, the Polish Physical Society established the Marian Smoluchowski Medal, an international award for significant achievements in the field of physics in recognition of Smoluchowski's contributions to science.

In 1970, the International Astronomical Union named one of the craters on the Moon Smoluchowski after the Polish physicist.

The Institute of Physics of the Jagiellonian University bears the name of Smoluchowski in honour of the scientist.

Streets in several Polish cities bear the name of Smoluchowski including in Gdańsk, Lublin, Malbork, Kraków, Poznań and Wrocław.

In 2017, the Senate of Poland passed a special resolution on the 100th anniversary of Smoluchowski's death establishing 2017 as the "Year of Marian Smoluchowski".

Physicist Andrzej Kajetan Wróblewski named Smoluchowski among the greatest Polish physicists of the 20th century alongside Marie Curie, Karol Olszewski, Jerzy Pniewski and Marian Danysz.

In 2022, Jan Grzanka published a book Zapomniany geniusz fizyki: rzecz o Marianie Smoluchowskim (The Forgotten Physics Genius: Marian Smoluchowski) devoted to the life and scientific work of Smoluchowski.

== See also ==
- Critical opalescence
- Electrophoresis
- List of Poles (physicists)
- Marian Smoluchowski Medal
- Timeline of Polish science and technology

== Literature ==
- A. Teske, Marian Smoluchowski, Leben und Werk. Polish Academy of Sciences, Warsaw, 1977.
- A. Einstein and M. von Smoluchowski: "Untersuchungen über die Theorie der Brownschen Bewegung. Abhandlung über die Brownsche Bewegung und verwandte Erscheinungen", Harri Deutsch, 1997. (Ostwalds Klassiker der exakten Wissenschaften Band 199). ISBN 3-8171-3207-7.
- S. Chandrasekhar, M. Kac, R. Smoluchowski, "Marian Smoluchowski - his life and scientific work", ed. by R.S. Ingarden, PWN, Warszawa 1999.
- E. Seneta (2001) Marian Smoluchowski, Statisticians of the Centuries (ed. C. C. Heyde and E. Seneta) pp. 299–302. New York: Springer.
- S. Ulam (1957) Marian Smoluchowski and the Theory of Probabilities in Physics, American Journal of Physics, 25, 475-481 (ISSN 0002-9505).
- Abraham Pais, Subtle is the Lord, chapter 5, section 5e. Einstein and Smoluchowski; Critical Opalescence, (pp. 100–103), Oxford University Press, (1982) 2005, ISBN 0-19-280672-6.
