= J. M. R. Parrondo =

Spanish physicist (born 1964)

- Born: 9 January 1964 (age 62); Madrid, Spain
- Education: UCM
- Known for: Parrondo's paradox Brownian ratchets Physics of information Statistical mechanics
- Scientific career
- Fields: Physicist
- Workplaces: UCM
- Doctoral advisor: Francisco Javier de la Rubia
- Other academic advisors: Thomas M. Cover; Katja Lindenberg

Juan Manuel Rodríguez Parrondo (born 9 January 1964) is a Spanish physicist. He is recognised for the conception of Parrondo's paradox and his contributions in the thermodynamical study of information.

== Biography ==
Juan Parrondo received his bachelors degree in 1987 and defended his Ph.D at Complutense University of Madrid in 1992. He started a permanent position at UCM at 1996. In the same year he invented the well-known Parrondo's paradox, according to which 2 losing strategies may win while working together. Since then, the paradox has been widely used in biology and finances. He has also completed a lot of research in the field of information theory, mostly looking at information as a thermodynamic concept, which as a result of ergodicity breaking changed the entropy of the system.

== Works by Juan M.R. Parrondo ==
"Noise-Induced Non-equilibrium Phase Transition" C. Van den Broeck, J. M. R. Parrondo and R. Toral, Physical Review Letters, vol. 73 p. 3395 (1994)
