= Critical opalescence =

Increase in photonic scattering during a phase transition

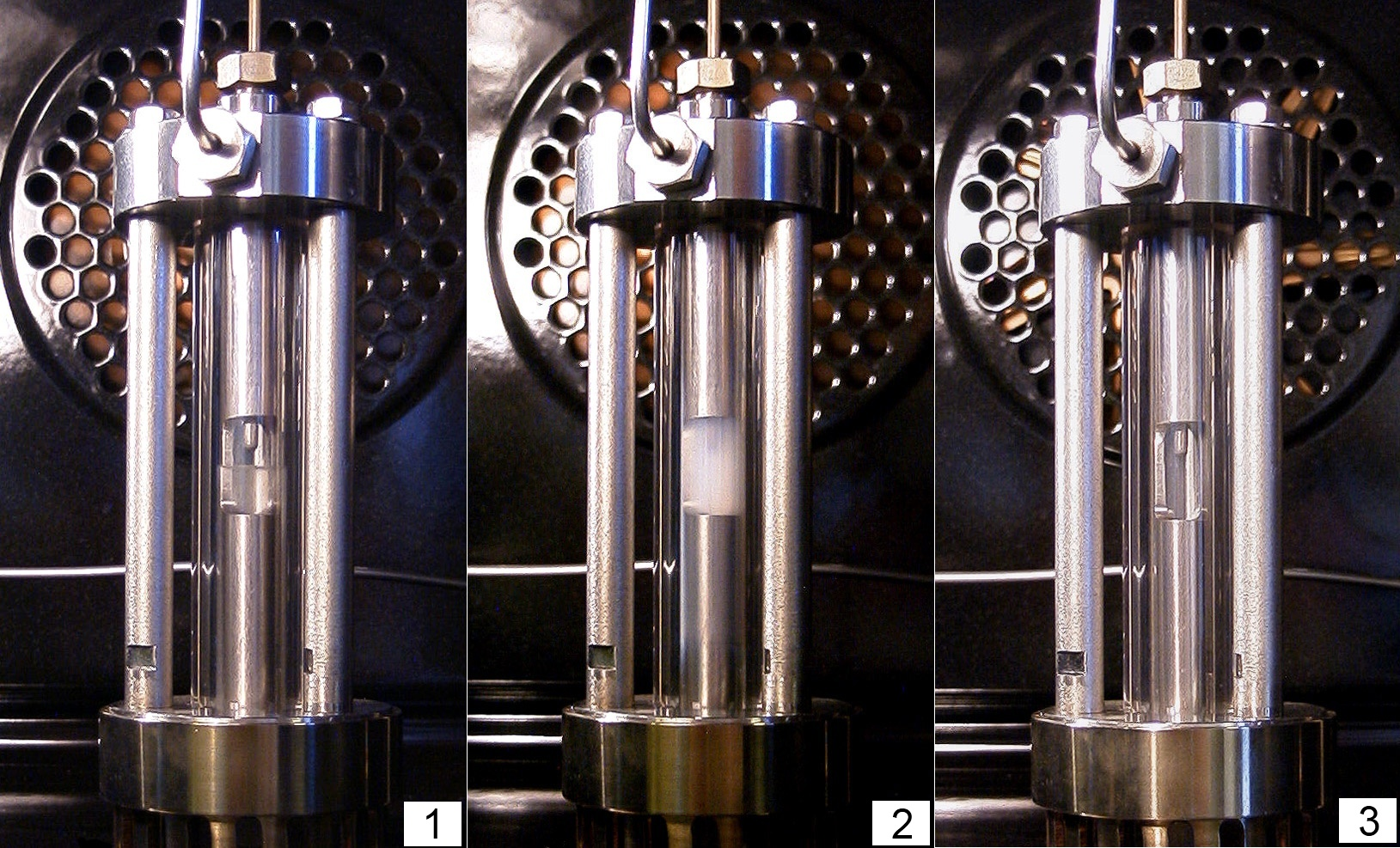
Left-to-right sequence of heating a mass of ethane in a constant volume. In the center panel, critical opalescence is seen.

In physics, critical opalescence refers to the dramatic increase in scattering of light in the region of a continuous, or second-order, phase transition. Near the critical point, the properties of the liquid and gas phases become indistinguishable. The resulting density fluctuations are on such a large scale that they scatter visible light, giving the substance a cloudy or opalescent look. This phenomenon is an indicator of critical phenomena in fluids and can be observed in various materials under the right conditions.

== History ==
Originally reported by French physicist Charles Cagniard de la Tour in 1823 in mixtures of alcohol and water, its importance was recognised by Irish chemist Thomas Andrews in 1869 following his experiments on the liquid-gas transition in carbon dioxide; many other examples have been discovered since. In 1908 the Polish physicist Marian Smoluchowski became the first to ascribe the phenomenon of critical opalescence to large density fluctuations. In 1910 Albert Einstein showed that the link between critical opalescence and Rayleigh scattering is quantitative.

== Examples ==
=== Binary fluid mixtures ===
The phenomenon is most commonly demonstrated in binary fluid mixtures, such as methanol and cyclohexane. As the critical point is approached, the sizes of the gas and liquid region begin to fluctuate over increasingly large length scales (the correlation length of the liquid diverges). As the density fluctuations become of a size comparable to the wavelength of light, the light is scattered and causes the normally transparent liquid to appear cloudy. Tellingly, the opalescence does not diminish as one gets closer to the critical point, where the largest fluctuations can reach even centimetre proportions, confirming the physical relevance of smaller fluctuations.

Approaching the critical point from the opposite direction, in case of liquid-gas transition, the gas phase may contain drops of liquid as mist and spray, and the boiling liquid phase may contain bubbles of gas phase as foam. Far from the critical point the gravity causes liquid drops and gas bubbles to rapidly settle towards the interface and surface tension causes drops and bubbles to rapidly merge to larger ones, which settle even faster. But as critical point is approached, the density difference between liquid and vapour diminishes and so does the surface tension. These effects will slow down settling of drops and bubbles and their merger, such that boiling liquid forms increasingly refractory to settling and fine mist and foam around the interface.

In case of liquid-liquid critical point, again the liquids of limited solubility precipitate out as emulsions which far from critical point on the immiscible side readily settle to interface. As critical point is approached, density difference decreases along with the interfacial surface tension, so that precipitation takes place as increasingly fine and refractory to settling emulsion.

Since liquid-gas critical point occurs at pressures over 30 bar for all substances except some cryogenic gases, demonstrating it requires a transparent vessel safe under over 30 bar, while liquid-liquid critical point for many systems can be demonstrated at ambient pressure and modest temperatures.

=== Other examples ===
Ferromagnetic material has large fluctuations of magnetic domains near the Curie point. Since neutron scattering is affected by magnetic moments of atoms, this creates critical opalescence. Specifically, if a beam of neutrons is fired at a ferromagnetic material, then as it approaches the Curie point, it would start scattering the neutrons as if it is turning opaque to neutrons.
