= Adiabatic quantum motor =

Scheme of an adiabatic quantum motor made of a quantum dot coupled to a rotating wheel

An adiabatic quantum motor is a mechanical device, typically nanometric, driven by a flux of quantum particles and able to perform cyclic motions. The adjective "adiabatic" in this context refers to the limit when the dynamics of the mechanical degrees of freedom is slow compared with the dwell time of the particles passing through the device. In this regime, it is commonly assumed that the mechanical degrees of freedom behave classically. This class of devices works essentially as quantum pumps operated in reverse. While in a quantum pump, the periodic movement of some parameters pumps quantum particles from one reservoir to another, in a quantum motor a DC current of particles induces the cyclic motion of the device. One key feature of these motors is that quantum interferences can be used to increase their efficiency by enhancing the reflection coefficient of the scattered particles. Although there are several proposals for the realization of adiabatic quantum motors, none of them have been verified experimentally.

== Adiabatic quantum motors ==
- Anderson's adiabatic quantum motor
- Thouless motor
- Adiabatic quantum motors based on quantum dots
- Nanomagnet coupled to a quantum spin Hall edge (formally equivalent to a Thouless motor)
- Adiabatic quantum motors driven by temperature gradients
