= Numerical solution of the convection–diffusion equation =

The convection–diffusion equation describes the flow of heat, particles, or other physical quantities in situations where there is both diffusion and convection or advection. For information about the equation, its derivation, and its conceptual importance and consequences, see the main article convection–diffusion equation. This article describes how to use a computer to calculate an approximate numerical solution of the discretized equation, in a time-dependent situation.

In order to be concrete, this article focuses on heat flow, an important example where the convection–diffusion equation applies. However, the same mathematical analysis works equally well to other situations like particle flow.

A general discontinuous finite element formulation is needed. The unsteady convection–diffusion problem is considered, at first the known temperature T is expanded into a Taylor series with respect to time taking into account its three components. Next, using the convection diffusion equation an equation is obtained from the differentiation of this equation.

== Equation ==
=== General ===
The following convection diffusion equation is considered here

$$c \rho\left[\frac{\partial T(x,t)}{\partial t} + \epsilon u \frac{\partial T(x,t)}{\partial x}\right]=\lambda \frac{\partial^2 T(x,t)}{\partial x^2} + Q(x,t)$$

In the above equation, four terms represents transience, convection, diffusion and a source term respectively, where

- T is the temperature in particular case of heat transfer otherwise it is the variable of interest
- t is time
- c is the specific heat
- u is velocity
- ε is porosity that is the ratio of liquid volume to the total volume
- ρ is mass density
- λ is thermal conductivity
- Q(x,t) is source term representing the capacity of internal sources

The equation above can be written in the form

$$\frac{\partial T}{\partial t} = a \frac{\partial^2 T}{\partial x^2} - \epsilon u \frac{\partial T}{\partial x} + \frac{Q}{c \rho}$$

where a = λ/cρ is the diffusion coefficient.

=== Solving the convection–diffusion equation using the finite difference method ===
A solution of the transient convection–diffusion equation can be approximated through a finite difference approach, known as the finite difference method (FDM).

==== Explicit scheme ====
An explicit scheme of FDM has been considered and stability criteria are formulated. In this scheme, temperature is totally dependent on the old temperature (the initial conditions) and θ, a weighting parameter between 0 and 1. Substitution of θ = 0 gives the explicit discretization of the unsteady conductive heat transfer equation.

$$\frac{T_i ^f - T_i ^{f-1}}{\Delta t} = a \frac{T_{i-1} ^{f-1} - 2T_i ^{f-1} + T_{i+1} ^{f-1}}{h^2} - \epsilon u \frac{T_{i+1} ^{f-1} - T_{i-1} ^{f-1}}{2h} + \frac{Q_i ^{f-1}}{c \rho}$$

where

- Δt = t^{f} − t^{f − 1}
- h is the uniform grid spacing (mesh step)

$$T_i^f = \left(1-\frac{2a\Delta t}{h^2}\right) T_i ^{f-1} + \left(\frac{a \Delta t}{h^2} + \frac{\epsilon u \Delta t}{2h}\right) T_{i-1} ^{f-1} + \left(\frac{a \Delta t}{h^2} - \frac{\epsilon u \Delta t}{2h}\right) T_{i+1} ^{f-1} + \frac{Q_i ^{f-1}}{c \rho} \Delta t$$

===== Stability criteria =====
The inequalities
$$\begin{align}
h &< \frac{2a}{|\epsilon u|}, &
\Delta t &<\frac a{\epsilon^2u^2/4+a^2/h^2} <\frac{h^2}{2a}<\frac{h}{|\epsilon u|}
\end{align}$$
follow from setting $Q^f_i\to0$ and requiring the ansatz $T^f_i\to T^f_0\exp(\sqrt{-1}i\theta)$ not to gain amplitude as f increases for any $\theta$. They set a stringent maximum limit to the time step that represents a serious limitation for the explicit scheme. This method is not recommended for general transient problems because the maximum possible time step has to be reduced as the square of h.

==== Implicit scheme ====
In implicit scheme, the temperature is dependent at the new time level t + Δt. After using implicit scheme, it was found that all coefficients are positive. It makes the implicit scheme unconditionally stable for any size of time step. This scheme is preferred for general purpose transient calculations because of its robustness and unconditional stability. The disadvantage of this method is that more procedures are involved and due to larger Δt, truncation error is also larger.

==== Crank–Nicolson scheme ====
In the Crank–Nicolson method, the temperature is equally dependent on t and t + Δt. It is a second-order method in time and this method is generally used in diffusion problems.

===== Stability criteria =====
$$\Delta t < \frac{h^2}{a}$$

This time step limitation is less restricted than the explicit method. The Crank–Nicolson method is based on the central differencing and hence it is second-order accurate in time.

== Finite element methods for the convection–diffusion problem ==
For the conduction equation, finite element solutions are in general stable. In contrast, the standard Galerkin finite element method does not have stable numerical solutions for a pure convection problem in general. The solution will be unstable when it contains any discontinuity, for example a shockwave. Regardless of the size and shape of finite elements, the discontinuity cannot be resolved correctly and spurious oscillation occurs.

Therefore, the convection–diffusion equation can also not be solved with the Galerkin finite element approach, when it is convection dominated (i.e. Péclet number $\mathrm{Pe} \gg 1$) and the diffusion is not strong enough to flatten out the discontinuity.

Dealing with discontinuities is not trivial, but for other numerical schemes several tactics have been employed successfully, like upwind schemes in the case of finite differences. Modified finite element methods that can compute stable solutions to convection dominated problems have been developed in the past, like the shock-capturing streamline diffusion finite element method, but did not see widespread use. A more recent development is the residual based artificial viscosity finite element method, which is simpler to implement.

== See also ==
- Advanced Simulation Library
- Convection–diffusion equation
- Double diffusive convection
- An Album of Fluid Motion
- Lagrangian and Eulerian specification of the flow field
- Fluid animation
- Finite volume method for unsteady flow
