= Parrondo's paradox =

Paradox of combining strategies

Parrondo's paradox is a paradox in game theory that describes how a combination of losing strategies can become a winning strategy. It is named after its creator, Juan Parrondo, who discovered the paradox in 1996.

A simple example involves two coin flip games: Game A uses a biased coin that loses 50.5% of the time, while Game B switches between two different biased coins depending on whether your current winnings are even or odd. Though both games individually favor the house, alternating between them creates a net winning strategy. This occurs because the alternation causes players to spend more time in the favorable states of Game B, while Game A's consistent bias helps reset the system into those advantageous conditions.

Parrondo devised the paradox in connection with his analysis of the Brownian ratchet, a thought experiment about a machine that can purportedly extract energy from random heat motions popularized by physicist Richard Feynman. However, the paradox disappears when rigorously analyzed. Winning strategies consisting of various combinations of losing strategies were explored in biology before Parrondo's paradox was published.

== Illustrative examples ==
=== Saw-tooth example ===
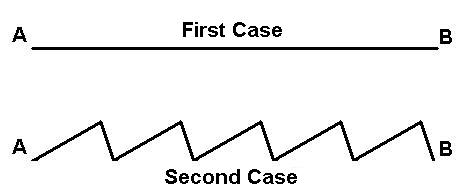
Figure 1

Consider an example in which there are two points A and B having the same altitude, as shown in Figure 1. In the first case, we have a flat profile connecting them. Here, if we leave some round marbles in the middle that move back and forth in a random fashion, they will roll around randomly but towards both ends with an equal probability. Now consider the second case where we have a saw-tooth-like profile between the two points. Here also, the marbles will roll towards either end depending on the local slope. Now if we tilt the whole profile towards the right, as shown in Figure 2, it is quite clear that both these cases will become biased towards B.

Now consider the game in which we alternate the two profiles while judiciously choosing the time between alternating from one profile to the other.

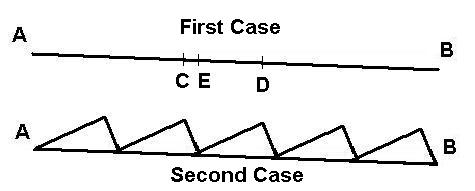
Figure 2

When we leave a few marbles on the first profile at point E, they distribute themselves on the plane showing preferential movements towards point B. However, if we apply the second profile when some of the marbles have crossed the point C, but none have crossed point D, we will end up having most marbles back at point E (where we started from initially) but some also in the valley towards point A given sufficient time for the marbles to roll to the valley. Then we again apply the first profile and repeat the steps (points C, D and E now shifted one step to refer to the final valley closest to A). If no marbles cross point C before the first marble crosses point D, we must apply the second profile shortly before the first marble crosses point D, to start over.

It easily follows that eventually we will have marbles at point A, but none at point B. Hence if we define having marbles at point A as a win and having marbles at point B as a loss, we clearly win by alternating (at correctly chosen times) between playing two losing games.

=== Coin-tossing example ===
A third example of Parrondo's paradox is drawn from the field of gambling. Consider playing two games, Game A and Game B with the following rules. For convenience, define $C_t$ to be our capital at time t, immediately before we play a game.

1. Winning a game earns us $1 and losing requires us to surrender $1. It follows that $C_{t+1} = C_t +1$ if we win at step t and $C_{t+1} = C_t -1$ if we lose at step t.
2. In Game A, we toss a biased coin, Coin 1, with probability of winning $P_1=(1/2)-\epsilon$, where $\epsilon$ is some small positive constant. This is clearly a losing game in the long run.
3. In Game B, we first determine if our capital is a multiple of some integer $M$. If it is, we toss a biased coin, Coin 2, with probability of winning $P_2=(1/10)-\epsilon$. If it is not, we toss another biased coin, Coin 3, with probability of winning $P_3=(3/4)-\epsilon$. The role of modulo $M$ provides the periodicity as in the ratchet teeth.

It is clear that by playing Game A, we will almost surely lose in the long run. Harmer and Abbott show via simulation that if $M=3$ and $\epsilon = 0.005,$ Game B is an almost surely losing game as well. In fact, Game B is a Markov chain, and an analysis of its state transition matrix (again with M=3) shows that the steady state probability of using coin 2 is 0.3836, and that of using coin 3 is 0.6164. As coin 2 is selected nearly 40% of the time, it has a disproportionate influence on the payoff from Game B, and results in it being a losing game.

However, when these two losing games are played in some alternating sequence - e.g. two games of A followed by two games of B (AABBAABB...), the combination of the two games is, paradoxically, a winning game. Not all alternating sequences of A and B result in winning games. For example, one game of A followed by one game of B (ABABAB...) is a losing game, while one game of A followed by two games of B (ABBABB...) is a winning game. This coin-tossing example has become the canonical illustration of Parrondo's paradox – two games, both losing when played individually, become a winning game when played in a particular alternating sequence.

==== Resolving the paradox ====
The apparent paradox has been explained using a number of sophisticated approaches, including Markov chains, flashing ratchets, simulated annealing, and information theory. One way to explain the apparent paradox is as follows:

- While Game B is a losing game under the probability distribution that results for $C_t$ modulo $M$ when it is played individually ($C_t$ modulo $M$ is the remainder when $C_t$ is divided by $M$), it can be a winning game under other distributions, as there is at least one state in which its expectation is positive.
- As the distribution of outcomes of Game B depend on the player's capital, the two games cannot be independent. If they were, playing them in any sequence would lose as well.

The role of $M$ now comes into sharp focus. It serves solely to induce a dependence between Games A and B, so that a player is more likely to enter states in which Game B has a positive expectation, allowing it to overcome the losses from Game A. With this understanding, the paradox resolves itself: The individual games are losing only under a distribution that differs from that which is actually encountered when playing the compound game. In summary, Parrondo's paradox is an example of how dependence can wreak havoc with probabilistic computations made under a naive assumption of independence. A more detailed exposition of this point, along with several related examples, can be found in Philips and Feldman.

== Applications ==
Parrondo's paradox is used extensively in game theory, and its application to engineering, population dynamics, financial risk, etc., are areas of active research. Parrondo's games are of little practical use such as for investing in stock markets as the original games require the payoff from at least one of the interacting games to depend on the player's capital. However, the games need not be restricted to their original form and work continues in generalizing the phenomenon. Similarities to volatility pumping and the two envelopes problem have been pointed out. Simple finance textbook models of security returns have been used to prove that individual investments with negative median long-term returns may be easily combined into diversified portfolios with positive median long-term returns. Similarly, a model that is often used to illustrate optimal betting rules has been used to prove that splitting bets between multiple games can turn a negative median long-term return into a positive one.

In evolutionary biology, both bacterial random phase variation and the evolution of less accurate sensors have been modelled and explained in terms of the paradox. In ecology, the periodic alternation of certain organisms between nomadic and colonial behaviors has been suggested as a manifestation of the paradox. There has been an interesting application in modelling multicellular survival as a consequence of the paradox and some interesting discussion on the feasibility of it. Applications of Parrondo's paradox can also be found in reliability theory.

== Name ==
In the early literature on Parrondo's paradox, it was debated whether the word 'paradox' is an appropriate description given that the Parrondo effect can be understood in mathematical terms. The 'paradoxical' effect can be mathematically explained in terms of a convex linear combination.

However, Derek Abbott, a leading researcher on the topic, provides the following answer regarding the use of the word 'paradox' in this context: "Is Parrondo's paradox really a "paradox"? This question is sometimes asked by mathematicians, whereas physicists usually don't worry about such things. The first thing to point out is that "Parrondo's paradox" is just a name, just like the "Braess's paradox" or "Simpson's paradox." Secondly, as is the case with most of these named paradoxes they are all really apparent paradoxes. People drop the word "apparent" in these cases as it is a mouthful, and it is obvious anyway. So no one claims these are paradoxes in the strict sense. In the wide sense, a paradox is simply something that is counterintuitive. Parrondo's games certainly are counterintuitive—at least until you have intensively studied them for a few months. The truth is we still keep finding new surprising things to delight us, as we research these games. I have had one mathematician complain that the games always were obvious to him and hence we should not use the word "paradox." He is either a genius or never really understood it in the first place. In either case, it is not worth arguing with people like that".

== See also ==
- Brazil nut effect
- Brownian ratchet
- Game theory
- List of paradoxes
- Ratchet effect
- Statistical mechanics
