= Katja Lindenberg =

Ecuadorian-American chemical physicist

Katja Lindenberg (born 1941) is an Ecuadorian-American theoretical chemical physicist whose research concerns statistical mechanics, stochastic processes, non-equilibrium thermodynamics, and quantum thermodynamics. She is Distinguished Professor of Chemistry and Chancellor's Associates Endowed Chair Emeritus at the University of California, San Diego.

== Education and career ==
Lindenberg is originally from Ecuador. She graduated from Alfred University in 1962, and completed her Ph.D. at Cornell University in 1967. After postdoctoral research at the University of Rochester, she joined the faculty at the University of California, San Diego in 1969. She retired in 2019.

== Contributions ==
With Bruce J. West, Lindenberg authored the book The Nonequilibrium Statistical Mechanics of Open and Closed Systems (Wiley/VCH, 1990). Her research has also studied chemical transport on fractal media.

== Recognition ==
Lindenberg was named a Fellow of the American Physical Society (APS) in 1992, after a nomination from the APS Division of Chemical Physics, "for her fundamental contributions to nonequilibrium statistical mechanics and the theory of stochastic processes toward the understanding of the evolution of coupled nonlinear systems of importance in physical applications".

The University of California System Senate gave Lindenberg the 2016 Oliver Johnson Award for Distinguished Senate Service, including serving as the first female chair of the UC San Diego faculty senate. In 2017, Jagiellonian University gave Lindenberg the Plus ratio quam vis medal. In 2019, the University of California, San Diego held a symposium on honor of her 50 years at the university and her retirement that year. In 2020 the university gave her their Revelle Medal in honor of her service to the university.
