= Bailout embedding =

Type of dynamical system

In the theory of dynamical systems, a bailout embedding is a system defined as

$$\begin{align}
&\frac{d}{dt} (u-f(x)) = -k(x) (u-f(x)), \\[8pt]
&\frac{dx}{dt}  = u.
\end{align}$$

Here the function k(x) < 0 on a set of unwanted orbits; otherwise k(x) > 0. The trajectories of the full system of a bailout embedding bail out—that is, detach—from the embedding, into a larger space, in which they move around. If, after some time these orbits arrive at a stable neighbourhood of the embedding, k(x) > 0, they collapse once more onto the embedding; that is, onto the original dynamics. The bailout embedding forms in this way an enlarged version of the dynamical system, one in which particular sets of orbits are cut from the asymptotic or limit set, while maintaining the dynamics of a different set of orbits—the wanted set—as attractors of the larger dynamical system. With a choice of k(x) = −(γ + ∇f), these dynamics are seen to detach from unstable regions such as saddle points in conservative systems.

One important application of the bailout embedding concept is to divergence-free flows; the most important class of these are Hamiltonian systems.
