= Drift current =

Movement of charge carriers due to the applied electric field

In condensed matter physics and electrochemistry, drift current is the electric current, or movement of charge carriers, which is due to the applied electric field, often stated as the electromotive force over a given distance. When an electric field is applied across a semiconductor material, a current is produced due to the flow of charge carriers.

The drift velocity is the average velocity of the charge carriers in the drift current. The drift velocity, and resulting current, is characterized by the mobility; for details, see electron mobility (for solids) or electrical mobility (for a more general discussion).

See drift–diffusion equation for the way that the drift current, diffusion current, and carrier generation and recombination are combined into a single equation.

== Overview ==
Drift current is the electric current caused by particles getting pulled by an electric field. The term is most commonly used in the context of electrons and holes in semiconductors, although the same concept also applies to metals, electrolytes, and so on.

Drift current is caused by the electric force: Charged particles get pushed by an electric field. Electrons, being negatively charged, get pushed in the opposite direction to the electric field, while holes get pushed in the same direction as the electric field, but the resulting conventional current points in the same direction as the electric field in both cases.

If an electric field is applied to an electron in a vacuum, the electron will accelerate faster and faster, in approximately a straight line. A drift current looks very different than that up close. Typically, electrons are moving randomly in all directions (Brownian motion), frequently changing direction when they collide with grain boundaries or other disturbances. Between collisions, the electric field subtly accelerates them in one direction. So over time, they move at the drift velocity on average, but at any instant the electrons are moving at the (typically much faster) thermal velocity.

The amount of drift current depends on the concentration of charge carriers and their mobility in the material or medium.

=== Drift current versus diffusion current ===
Drift current frequently occurs at the same time as diffusion current; the following table compares the two forms of current:

Drift current	Diffusion current
Drift current is caused by electric fields.	Diffusion current is caused by variation in the carrier concentration.
Direction of the drift current is always in the direction of the electric field.	Direction of the diffusion current depends on the gradient of the carrier concentration.
Obeys Ohm's law: $J=q\rho\mu E$	Obeys Fick's law: $J = -qD \frac{d \rho}{d x}$

== Drift current in a p-n junction diode ==
In a p-n junction diode, electrons and holes are the minority charge carriers in the p-region and the n-region, respectively. In an unbiased junction, due to the diffusion of charge carriers, the diffusion current, which flows from the p to n region, is exactly balanced by the equal and opposite drift current. The drift current in an unbiased junction is caused by the field formed due to the redistribution of charge carriers, the ionised donor and acceptor atoms additional electrons and holes are lost from diffusion, hence leaving positive and negative ions. These ions in the crystal lattice result in a charge disparity, creating a built in electric field. In a biased p-n junction, the drift current is independent of the biasing, as the number of minority carriers is independent of the biasing voltages. But as minority charge carriers can be thermally generated, drift current is temperature dependent.

When an electric field is applied across the semiconductor material, the charge carriers attain a certain drift velocity. This combined effect of movement of the charge carriers constitutes a current known as "drift current". Drift current density due to the charge carriers such as free electrons and holes is the current passing through a square centimeter area perpendicular to the direction of flow.

(i) Drift current density $J_n$, due to free electrons is given by:

$J_n=qn\mu_nE\quad\frac{\text{A}}{\text{cm}^2}$

(ii) Drift current density $J_p$, due to holes is given by:

$J_p=qp\mu_pE\quad\frac{\text{A}}{\text{cm}^2}$

Where:
$n$ - Number of free electrons per cubic centimeter

$p$ - Number of holes per cubic centimeter

$\mu_n$ – Mobility of electrons in $\frac{\text{cm}^2}{\text{V}\cdot\text{s}}$

$\mu_p$ – Mobility of holes in $\frac{\text{cm}^2}{\text{V}\cdot\text{s}}$

$E$ – Applied electric field intensity in $\frac{\text{V}}{\text{cm}}$

$q$ – Charge of an electron = 1.6 × 10^{−19} coulomb
