= List of AIP Publishing academic journals =

This is a list of academic journals currently distributed by AIP Publishing, on behalf of both its parent organization the American Institute of Physics as well as for a number of other scientific organizations. This list does not include all journals which have ever been distributed by AIP Publishing but only the notable ones (i.e., have an article here). ISSNs are for the web version of a journal, unless indicated otherwise.

== List ==
Journal	ISO 4 abbreviation	Publisher(s)	Published	ISSN
AIP Advances	AIP Adv.	AIP	2011–present	ISSN 2158-3226
APL Materials	APL Mater	AIP	2013–present	ISSN 2166-532X
APL Photonics	APL Photonics	AIP	2016–present	ISSN 2378-0967
Applied Physics Letters	Appl. Phys. Lett.	AIP	1962–present	ISSN 0003-6951 (print); ISSN 1077-3118 (web)
Applied Physics Reviews	Appl. Phys. Rev.	AIP	2014–present (Note: Existed from 1980 to 2013 as a part of the Journal of Applied Physics before it began being published separately in 2014.)	ISSN 1931-9401
Biomicrofluidics	Biomicrofluidics	AIP	2007–present	ISSN 1932-1058
Chaos: An Interdisciplinary Journal of Nonlinear Science	Chaos	AIP	1991–present	ISSN 1054-1500 (print); ISSN 1089-7682 (web)
Journal of Applied Physics	J. Appl. Phys.	AIP	1931–present	ISSN 0021-8979 (print); ISSN 1089-7550 (web)
The Journal of Chemical Physics	J. Chem. Phys.	AIP	1933–present	ISSN 0021-9606 (print); ISSN 1089-7690 (web)
Journal of Mathematical Physics	J. Math. Phys.	AIP	1960–present	ISSN 0022-2488 (print); ISSN 1089-7658 (web)
Journal of Physical and Chemical Reference Data	J. Phys. Chem. Ref. Data	AIP	1972–present	ISSN 0047-2689 (print); ISSN 1529-7845 (web)
Journal of Renewable and Sustainable Energy	J. Renew. Sustain. Energy	AIP	2009–present	ISSN 1941-7012
Low Temperature Physics	Low Temp. Phys.	AIP	1997–present	ISSN 1063-777X (print); ISSN 1090-6517 (web)
Physics of Fluids	Phys. Fluids	AIP	1994–present	ISSN 1070-6631 (print); ISSN 1089-7666 (web)
Physics of Plasmas	Phys. Plasmas	AIP	1994–present	ISSN 1070-664X (print); ISSN 1089-7674 (web)
Review of Scientific Instruments	Rev. Sci. Instrum.	AIP	1930–present	ISSN 0034-6748 (print); ISSN 1089-7623 (web)
Journal of the Acoustical Society of America	J. Acoust. Soc. Am.	Acoustical Society of America	1929–present (Note: AIP began publishing the journal in 1932)	ISSN 0001-4966 (print); ISSN 1520-8524 (web)
American Journal of Physics	Am. J. Phys.	American Association of Physics Teachers	1933–present	ISSN 0002-9505 (print); ISSN 1943-2909 (web)
The Physics Teacher	Phys. Teach.	American Association of Physics Teachers	1963–present	ISSN 0031-921X (print); ISSN 1943-4928 (web)
Journal of Vacuum Science & Technology A: Vacuum, Surfaces, and Films	J. Vac. Sci. Technol. A	American Vacuum Society	1983–present	ISSN 0734-2101 (print); ISSN 1520-8559 (web)
Journal of Vacuum Science & Technology B: Microelectronics and Nanometer Structures	J. Vac. Sci. Technol. B	American Vacuum Society	1991–present	ISSN 2166-2746 (print); ISSN 2166-2754 (web)
Chinese Journal of Chemical Physics	Chin. J. Chem. Phys.	Chinese Physical Society	1988–present	ISSN 1674-0068 (print); ISSN 2327-2244 (web)
Journal of Rheology	J. Rheol.	Society of Rheology	1977–present (Note: Continues back to 1929 under several older titles)	ISSN 0148-6055 (print); ISSN 1520-8516 (web)
Matter and Radiation at Extremes	Matter Radiat. Extremes	China Academy of Engineering Physics	2016–present	ISSN 2468-080X
