= APL =

APL is an abbreviation, acronym, or initialism that may refer to:

== Science and technology ==
- 132524 APL, an asteroid
- Abductor pollicis longus muscle, in the human hand
- Acute promyelocytic leukemia, a subtype of acute myelogenous leukemia
- Applied Physics Letters, a physics journal
- Applied Physics Laboratory, at Johns Hopkins University
- Applied Physics Laboratory at the University of Washington

=== Computing ===
- .apl, the file extension of the Monkey's Audio metadata file
- AMD Performance Library, renamed Framewave, a computer compiler library; see AMD FireStream § Software Development Kit
- Address Prefix List, a DNS record type
- Advanced Physical Layer, an extension of Ethernet 10BASE-T1L for field devices
- APL (codepage), the character set for programming in APL

==== Computer languages ====
- APL (programming language), an array-based programming language
- Address programming language, an early high-level programming language developed in the Soviet Union
- Associative Programming Language, a database query language
- Alexa Presentation Language, a language for developing Amazon Alexa skills

==== Legal agreements for software and data ====
- Adaptive Public License, an Open Source license from the University of Victoria, Canada
- AROS Public License, a license of AROS Research Operating System
- Arphic Public License, a free font license

== Military and politics ==
- A US Navy hull classification symbol: Barracks craft (APL)
- Aden Protectorate Levies, a militia force for local defense of the Aden Protectorate
- American Protective League, a World War I-era pro-war organization
- Irish Anti-Partition League, a Northern Ireland political organisation

== Transportation ==
- Nampula Airport (IATA airport code: APL), in Mozambique
- American President Lines, a container transportation and shipping company
- Advanced Production and Loading, a Norwegian marine engineering company formed in 1993
- APL Logistics, a Japan-based freight forwarding and transportation company

== Sport ==
- American Patriot League, a proposed American football spring league
- American Premiere League, a Twenty20 cricket league in the US
- Afghanistan Premier League, a defunct Afghan Twenty20 cricket league
- Afghanistan Premier League (2026), an Afghan Twenty20 cricket league

=== Association football / soccer ===
- Australian Professional Leagues, an Australian governing body
- Afghan Premier League, a men's league in Afghanistan
- Alberta Premier League, a Canadian league
- Abkhazian Premier League, the top-level league of Abkhazia
- Armenian Premier League, the top-level league of Armenia
- Azerbaijan Premier League, the top-level league of Azerbaijan

== Other uses ==
- apl.de.ap (born 1974), pseudonym of Allan Pineda Lindo, Filipino–American musician
- Association of Pension Lawyers, UK
- Athletic Propulsion Labs, an American clothing company formed in 2009
- Aurora Public Library (disambiguation)

== See also ==
- APL Pipers (formerly the Delhi SG Pipers), an Indian field hockey team
- A. P. L. Bazin (Antoine-Pierre-Louis; 1799–1863), French sinologist
- APL Materials, a scientific journal published by the American Institute of Physics
- APL Photonics, a scientific journal published by the American Institute of Physics
- AAPL (disambiguation)
- APPL: Area Police/Private Security Liaison
- APLL (disambiguation)
