= Brownian motor =

Nanoscale machine

Kinesin, an example of a molecular motor that uses ATP to "walk" along nanotubules, is now thought to be an example of a Brownian motor.

Brownian motors are nanoscale or molecular machines that use chemical reactions to generate directed motion in space. The theory behind Brownian motors relies on the phenomenon of Brownian motion, random motion of particles suspended in a fluid (a liquid or a gas) resulting from their collision with the fast-moving molecules in the fluid.

On the nanoscale (1–100 nm), viscosity dominates inertia, and the extremely high degree of thermal noise in the environment makes conventional directed motion all but impossible, because the forces impelling these motors in the desired direction are minuscule when compared to the random forces exerted by the environment. Brownian motors operate specifically to utilise this high level of random noise to achieve directed motion, and as such are only viable on the nanoscale.

The concept of Brownian motors is a recent one, having only been coined in 1995 by Peter Hänggi, but the existence of such motors in nature may have existed for a very long time and help to explain crucial cellular processes that require movement at the nanoscale, such as protein synthesis and muscular contraction. If this is the case, Brownian motors may have implications for the foundations of life itself.

In more recent times, humans have attempted to apply this knowledge of natural Brownian motors to solve human problems. The applications of Brownian motors are most obvious in nanorobotics due to its inherent reliance on directed motion.

== History ==
=== 20th century ===
This is a simulation of the Brownian motion of a big particle (dust particle) that collides with a large set of smaller particles (molecules of a gas) which move with different velocities in different random directions.

The Place of the Solitaires

Let the place of the solitaires
Be a place of perpetual undulation.

Whether it be in mid-sea
On the dark, green water-wheel,
Or on the beaches,
There must be no cessation
Of motion, or of the noise of motion,
The renewal of noise
And manifold continuation;

And, most, of the motion of thought
And its restless iteration,

In the place of the solitaires,
Which is to be a place of perpetual undulation.

— Wallace Stevens (1879–1955).

The term "Brownian motor" was originally invented by Swiss theoretical physicist Peter Hänggi in 1995. The Brownian motor, like the phenomenon of Brownian motion that underpinned its underlying theory, was also named after 19th century Scottish botanist Robert Brown, who, while looking through a microscope at pollen of the plant Clarkia pulchella immersed in water, famously described the random motion of pollen particles in water in 1827. In 1905, almost eighty years later, theoretical physicist Albert Einstein published a paper where he modeled the motion of the pollen as being moved by individual water molecules, and this was verified experimentally by Jean Perrin in 1908, who was awarded the Nobel Prize in Physics in 1926 "for his work on the discontinuous structure of matter". These developments helped to create the fundamentals of the present theories of the nanoscale world.

Nanoscience has traditionally long remained at the intersection of the physical sciences of physics and chemistry, but more recent developments in research increasingly position it beyond the scope of either of these two traditional fields.

=== 21st century ===
In 2002, a seminal paper on Brownian motors published in the American Institute of Physics magazine Physics Today, "Brownian motors", by Dean Astumian and Peter Hänggi. There, they proposed the then novel concept of Brownian motors and posited that "thermal motion combined with input energy gives rise to a channeling of chance that can be used to exercise control over microscopic systems". Astumian and Hänggi provide in their paper a copy of Wallace Stevens' 1919 poem "The Place of the Solitaires" to elegantly illustrate, from an abstract perspective, the ceaseless nature of noise.

Inspired by the fascinating mechanism by which proteins move in the face of thermal noise, many physicists are working to understand molecular motors at a mesoscopic scale. An important insight from this work is that, in some cases, thermal noise can assist directed motion by providing a mechanism for overcoming energy barriers. In those cases, one speaks of "Brownian motors." In this article, we focus on several examples that bring out some prominent underlying physical concepts that have emerged. But first we note that poets, too, have been fascinated by noise; see box 1.

...

In the microscopic world, "There must be no cessation / Of motion, or of the noise of motion" (box 1). Rather than fighting it, Brownian motors take advantage of the ceaseless noise to move particles efficiently and reliably.

— Dean Astumian and Peter Hänggi, "Brownian Motors"

A year after the Astumian-Hänggi paper, David Leigh's organic chemistry group reported the first artificial molecular Brownian motors. In 2007 the same team reported a Maxwell's demon-inspired molecular information ratchet.

Another important demonstration of nanoengineering and nanotechnology was the building of a practical artificial Brownian motor by IBM in 2018. Specifically, an energy landscape was created by accurately shaping a nanofluidic slit, and alternate potentials and an oscillating electric field were then used to "rock" nanoparticles to produce directed motion. The experiment successfully made the nanoparticles move along a track in the shape of the outline of the IBM logo and serves as an important milestone in the practical use of Brownian motors and other elements at the nanoscale.

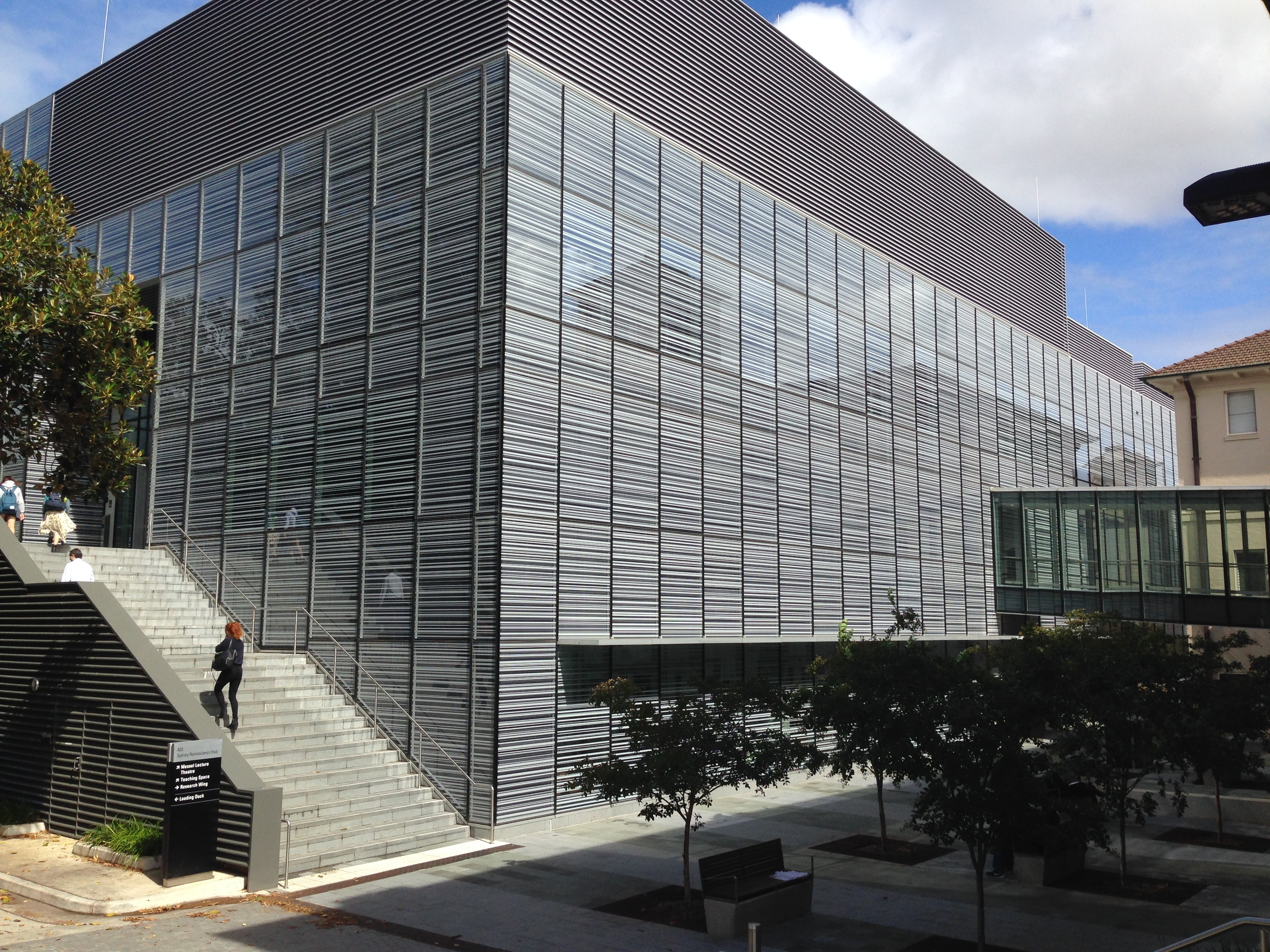
The Sydney Nanoscience Hub, a AU$150 million purpose-built facility for nanoscale research and education.

Additionally, various institutions around the world, such as the University of Sydney Nano Institute, headquartered at the Sydney Nanoscience Hub (SNH), and the Swiss Nanoscience Institute (SNI) at the University of Basel, are examples of the research activity emerging in the field of nanoscience. Brownian motors remain a central concept in both the understanding of natural molecular motors and the construction of useful nanoscale machines that involve directed motion.

Nanoscience research within the Swiss Nanoscience Institute (SNI) is focused on areas of potential benefit to the life sciences, sustainability, and information and communications technologies. The aim is to explore phenomena at a nanoscale and to identify and apply new pioneering principles. This involves researchers immersing themselves in the world of individual atoms and molecules. At this level, the classical disciplines of physics, biology and chemistry merge into one. Interdisciplinary collaboration between different branches of science and institutions is thus a key element of the SNI's day-to-day work.

— Swiss Nanoscience Institute, The University of Basel Website

== Theory ==
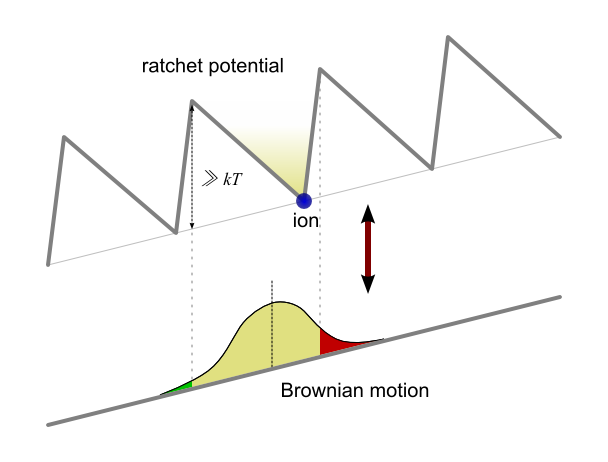
The ratchet model serves as a theoretical underpinning of the Brownian motor.

The thermal noise on the nanoscale is so great that moving in a particular direction is as difficult as "walking in a hurricane" or "swimming in molasses". The theoretical operation of the Brownian motor can be explained by ratchet theory, wherein strong random thermal fluctuations are allowed to move the particle in the desired direction, while energy is expended to counteract forces that would produce motion in the opposite direction. This motion can be both linear and rotational. In the biological sense and in the extent to which this phenomenon appears in nature, this exists as chemical energy is sourced from the molecule adenosine triphosphate (ATP).

The Brownian ratchet is an apparent perpetual motion machine that appears to violate the second law of thermodynamics, but was later debunked upon more detailed analysis by Richard Feynman and other physicists. The difference between real Brownian motors and fictional Brownian ratchets is that only in Brownian motors is there an input of energy in order to provide the necessary force to hold the motor in place to counteract the thermal noise that try to move the motor in the opposite direction.

Because Brownian motors rely on the random nature of thermal noise to achieve directed motion, they are stochastic in nature, in that they can be analysed statistically but not predicted precisely.

== Examples in nature ==
In biology, much of what we understand to be protein-based molecular motors may also in fact be Brownian motors. These molecular motors facilitate critical cellular processes in living organisms and, indeed, are fundamental to life itself.

Researchers have made significant advances in terms of examining these organic processes to gain insight into their inner workings. For example, molecular Brownian motors in the form of several different types of protein exist within humans. Two common biomolecular Brownian motors are ATP synthase, a rotary motor, and myosin II, a linear motor. The motor protein ATP synthase produces rotational torque that facilitates the synthesis of ATP from Adenosine diphosphate (ADP) and inorganic phosphate (P_{i}) through the following overall reaction:

ADP + P_{i} + 3H^{+}_{out} ⇌ ATP + H_{2}O + 3H^{+}_{in}

In contrast, the torque produced by myosin II is linear and is a basis for the process of muscle contraction. Similar motor proteins include kinesin and dynein, which all convert chemical energy into mechanical work by the hydrolysis of ATP. Many motor proteins within human cells act as Brownian motors by producing directed motion on the nanoscale, and some common proteins of this type are illustrated by the following computer-generated images.

Proteins acting as Brownian motors inside human cells

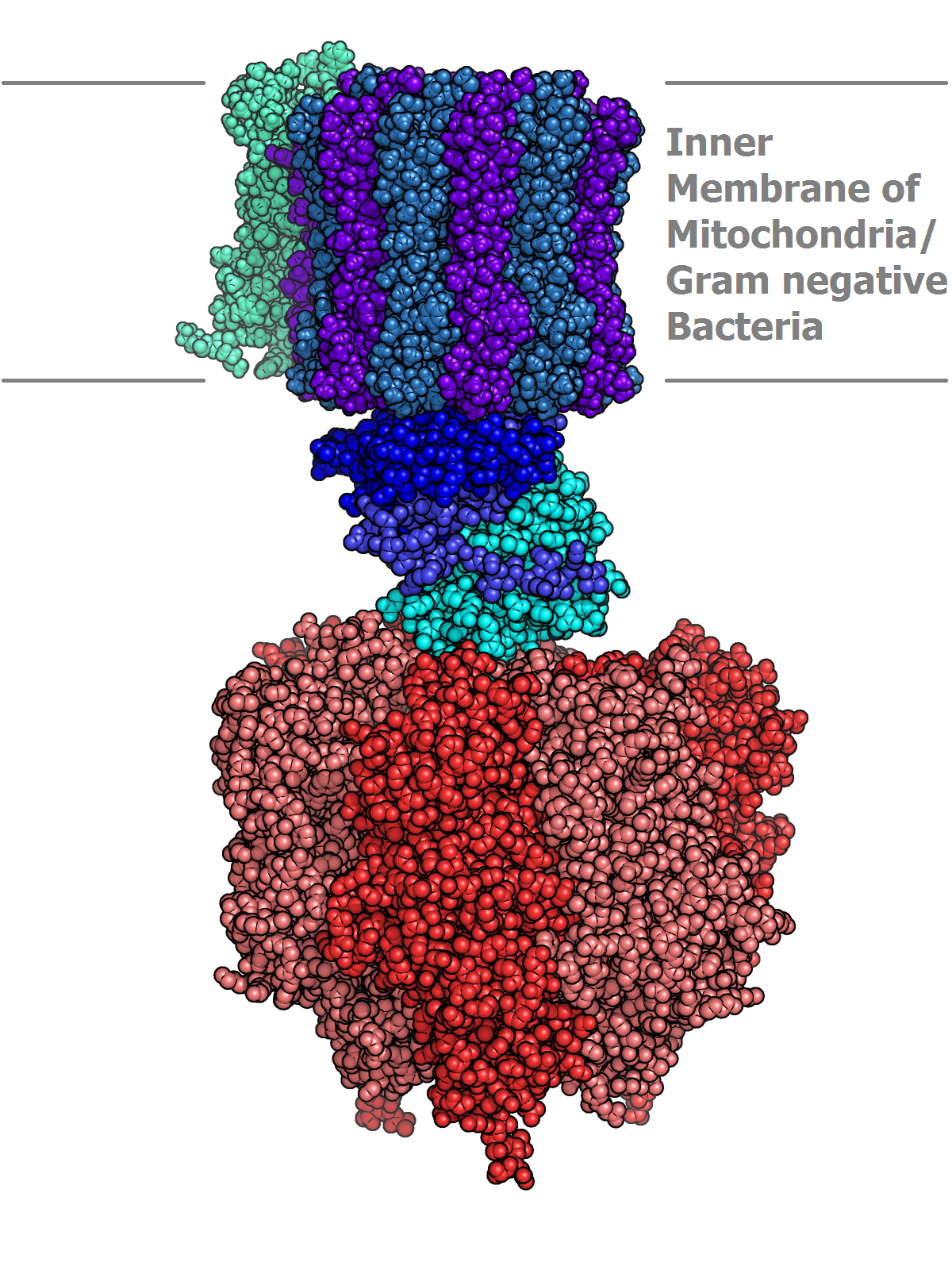
ATP Synthase

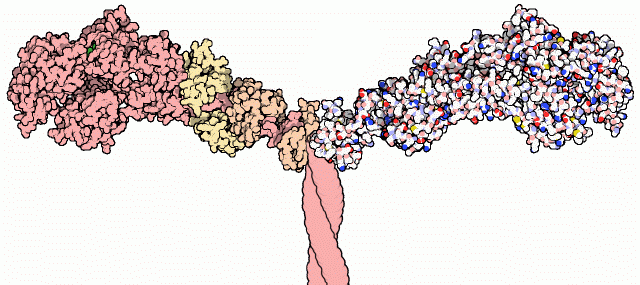
Myosin II

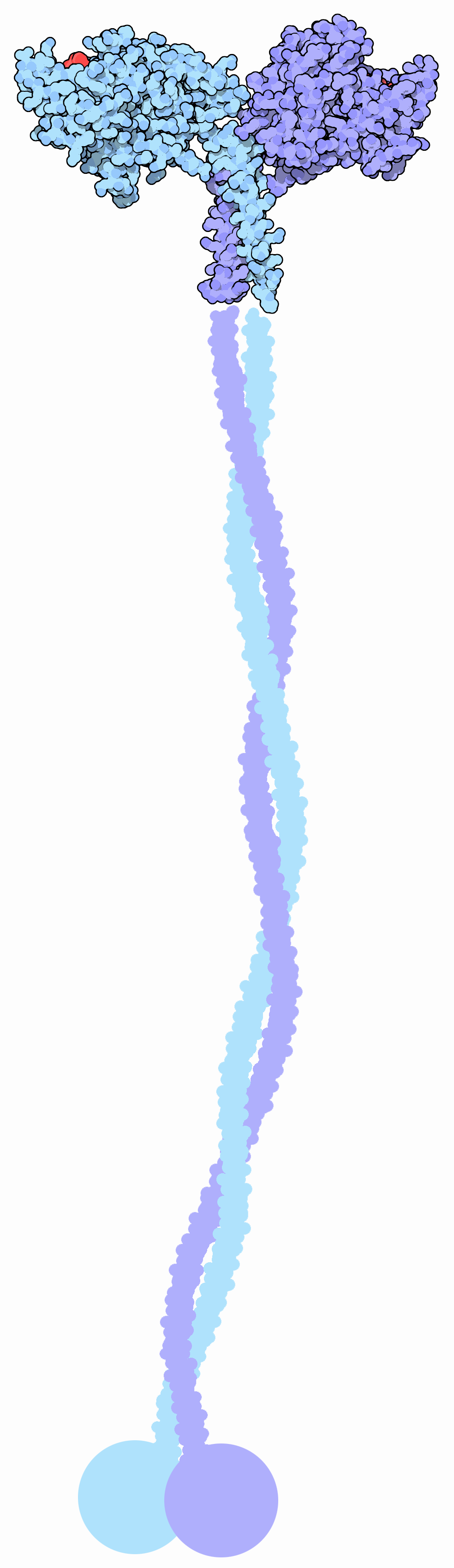
Kinesin

Dynein

== Applications ==
=== Nanorobotics ===
The relevance of Brownian motors to the requirement of directed motion in nanorobotics has become increasingly apparent to researchers from both academia and industry.

Artificial replications of Brownian motors are informed by and differ from nature, and one specific type is the photomotor, wherein the motor switches states due to pulses of light and generates directed motion. These photomotors, in contrast to their natural counterparts, are inorganic and possess greater efficiency and average velocity, and are thus better suited to human use than existing alternatives, such as organic protein motors.

Currently, one of the six current "Grand Challenges" of the University of Sydney Nano Institute is to develop nanorobotics for health, a key aspect of which is a "nanoscale parts foundry" that can produce nanoscale Brownian motors for "active transport around the body". The institute predicts that among the implications of this research is a "paradigm shift" in healthcare "away from the "break-fix" model to a focus on prevention and early intervention," such as in the case with heart disease:

The molecular-level changes in early heart disease occur on the nanoscale. To detect these changes, we are building nanoscale robots, smaller than cells, that will navigate the body. This will enable us to see inside even the narrowest blood vessels, to detect the fatty deposits (atherosclerotic plaque) that signal the start of arterial blockage and allow treatment before the disease progresses.

...

The impact of this project will be extensive. It will improve health outcomes for all Australians with heart disease and reduce healthcare costs. It has potential to benefit other health challenges, including cancer, dementia and other neurodegenerative diseases. It will provide a world-class collaborative environment to train the next generation of Australian researchers, driving innovation and development of new industries and jobs in Australia.

Professor Paul Bannon, an adult cardiothoracic surgeon of international standing and leading medical researcher, summarises the benefits of nanorobotics in health.

If I could miniaturise myself inside the body... I could detect early, treatable damage in your coronary arteries when you are 25 years old and thus avoid your premature death.

— Professor Paul Bannon, MBBS, PhD, FRACS

== See also ==
- Molecular machines
- Molecular motor
- Brownian motion
- Brownian ratchet
- Nanoengineering
- Nanorobotics
- Robert Brown
- Peter Hänggi
