= Arezoo Ardekani =

Iranian-American physicist and academic

Arezoo Motavalizadeh Ardekani
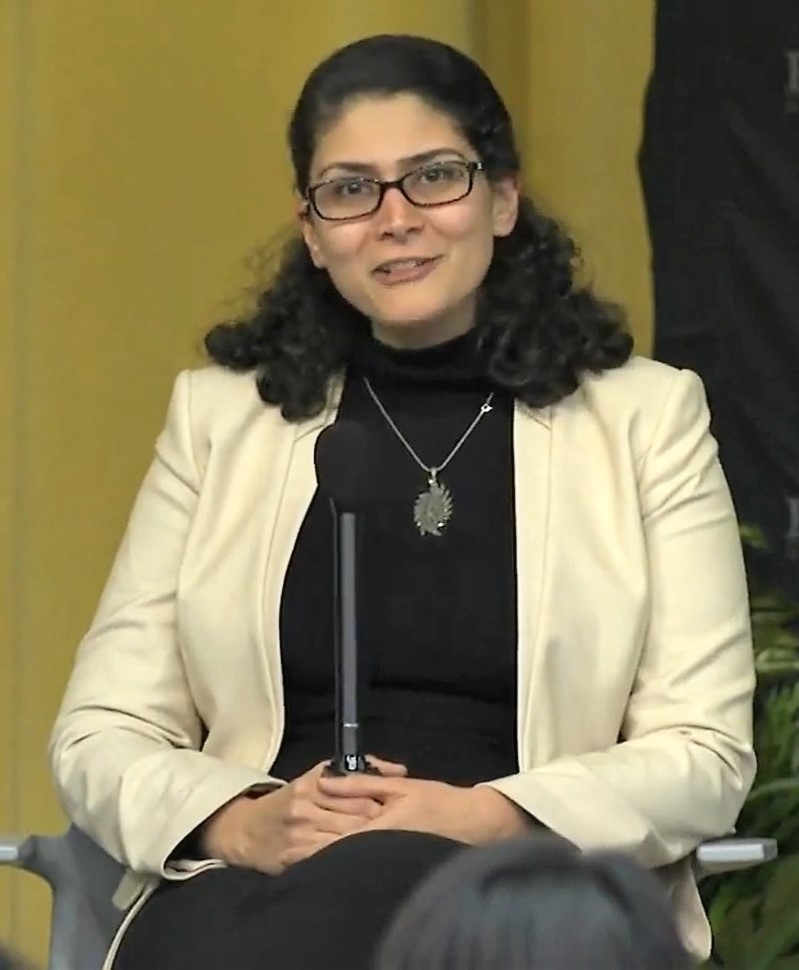
- Ardekani in 2019
- Born: Iran
- Education: Sharif University of Technology; University of California, Irvine
- Scientific career
- Workplaces: Massachusetts Institute of Technology; Purdue University
- Thesis: Particle interaction, deformation, and collision in viscous and viscoelastic fluids (2009)

Arezoo M. Ardekani is an Iranian-American physicist who is a professor at Purdue University. Her research considers the flow of complex fluids. She was elected a Fellow of the American Society of Mechanical Engineers in 2020 and a Fellow of the American Physical Society in 2022.

== Early life and education ==
Ardekani is from Iran. She was born in Isfahan, and was strongly passionate about becoming a scientist even from early childhood. She moved to Tehran for her undergraduate studies, where she earned a bachelor's degree at the Sharif University of Technology in 2003. Ardekani then attended the University of California, Irvine where she earned her master's degree in 2005 and her PhD in 2009. During her time there, Ardekani focused on particle interaction, deformation, and collision in viscous and viscoelastic fluids. She joined Massachusetts Institute of Technology as a Shapiro Postdoctoral Fellow, where she worked with Gareth H. McKinley on the dynamics of bead formation, filament thinning, and breakup in viscoelastic jets.

== Career and research ==
Ardekani started her independent career at the University of Notre Dame in 2011. She moved to Purdue University in 2014, where she leads the Complex Flow Lab. She investigates complex fluids and particle transport. She combines theoretical analyses with computational simulations to understand fluid flow.

Ardekani studied the microbes that accumulate at oil spills. She identified that microbes initially move due to chemotaxis (they are attracted to the chemical trail of a food source), but subsequently hydrodynamic interaction with drops can be important. Ardekani's research currently focuses on biological flows, suspension of particles and complex fluids. She is an Associate Editor of Physical Review Fluids, an Editorial Advisory Board Member of International Journal Multiphase Flow and the Journal of Non-Newtonian Fluid Mechanics. In 2022, Ardekani was a co-chair of the 2022 APS Division of Fluid Dynamics meeting held in Indianapolis. She has also served on many other committees, such as the APS Stanley Corrsin and SOR Metzner award committees.

== Awards and honors ==
- 2002 Technical Innovation Award at 16th AAAI Robotic Competition
- 2007 Amelia Earhart Fellowship
- 2007 Zonta International Amelia Earhart Award
- 2009 Shapiro Postdoctoral Fellowship
- 2010 Faculty for the Future grant, Schlumberger Foundation
- 2012 National Science Foundation CAREER Award
- 2016 Presidential Early Career Award for Scientists and Engineers
- 2019 College of Engineering Faculty Excellence Award for Early Career Research
- 2020 Society of Engineering Science Young Investigator Medal
- 2020 Elected Fellow of the American Society of Mechanical Engineers
- 2020 Society of Rheology Arthur B. Metzner Early Career Award
- 2020 Purdue University University Faculty Scholar
- 2022 Fellow, American Physical Society

== Selected publications ==
- A Karimi; S Yazdi; Arezoo M Ardekani (5 April 2013). "Hydrodynamic mechanisms of cell and particle trapping in microfluidics". Biomicrofluidics. 7 (2): 21501. doi:10.1063/1.4799787. ISSN 1932-1058. PMC 3631262. PMID 24404005.
- Gao-Jin Li; Arezoo M Ardekani (15 July 2014). "Hydrodynamic interaction of microswimmers near a wall". Physical Review E. 90 (1) 013010. Bibcode:2014PhRvE..90a3010L. doi:10.1103/PHYSREVE.90.013010. ISSN 1539-3755. PMC 4547626. PMID 25122372.
- A Karimi; David K. Karig; A Kumar; Arezoo M Ardekani (1 January 2015). "Interplay of physical mechanisms and biofilm processes: review of microfluidic methods". Lab on a Chip. 15 (1): 23–42. doi:10.1039/C4LC01095G. ISSN 1473-0197. PMC 4261921. PMID 25385289.
