= A. T. Charlie Johnson =

American physicist and professor

- Education: Stanford University (B.S.); Harvard University (Ph.D.)
- Known for: Graphene; Carbon nanotubes Scanning ion-conductance microscopy Molecular dynamics
- Awards: Fellow of the American Physical Society (2011)
- Scientific career
- Fields: Nanotechnology; Biophysics
- Workplaces: University of Pennsylvania; National Institute of Standards and Technology; Delft University of Technology; Harvard University
- Doctoral advisor: Michael Tinkham
- Website: www.physics.upenn.edu/people/standing-faculty/charlie-johnson nanophys.engineering.upenn.edu

Alan T. Charlie Johnson is an American physicist and a professor in physics and astronomy at the University of Pennsylvania. Johnson currently serves as the founding executive editor of the scientific journal AIP Advances and the co-founder of Graphene Frontiers, LLC.

Johnson's research is in experimental nanoscale physics, which combines nanotechnology and biophysics. His work specifically involves the transport within nanostructures and carbon nanotubes, which revolves around graphene, DNA, synthetic proteins, and other biomolecules. It also includes the development of scanning probe techniques that measure electronic properties in nanomaterials and nanodevices.

Previously, he served as the director of the Nano/Bio Interface Center at the University of Pennsylvania (2014-2017).

== Education ==
In 1984, Johnson received his B.S. in physics from Stanford University before going on to earn his Ph.D. in physics from Harvard in 1990, under the supervision of Michael Tinkham. Johnson's thesis was titled "Effect of leads and quantum fluctuations on small superconducting tunnel junctions."

Later, he served as a post-doctoral fellow at Delft University of Technology in the Netherlands, from 1990 to 1992, before working as a post-doctoral fellow at National Institute of Standards and Technology in Boulder, Colorado.

== Academic work ==
In 1994, Johnson began working at the University of Pennsylvania in the School of Arts and Sciences. He was promoted from assistant professor to associate professor in 2001. In 2002, Johnson received two secondary appointments in the School of Engineering: an appointment in electrical and systems engineering, and an appointment in materials science and engineering. In 2008, he received a full professorship. Johnson served as the associate chair for undergraduate affairs from 2005 to 2011. Since 2011, he has been the associate chair of graduate affairs.

Johnson has been a researcher at Penn since 1994. His research focuses on investigating transport phenomena (including charge, energy, and spin) in nanoscale systems, such as carbon nanotubes and graphene, along with hybrid nanostructures that incorporate proteins, synthetic peptides, and DNA.

== Companies and publications founded ==
Johnson co-founded Graphene Frontiers, LLC with Zhengtang Luo, a former post-doctoral researcher with whom he'd been working, through the UPStarts program in 2011. The company was selected for the National Science Foundation I-Corps program in 2011 and received an NSF SBIR grant in 2012. Graphene Frontiers produces one-atom-thick sheets of pure carbon known as graphene using a method known as roll-to-roll chemical vapor deposition.

Johnson also co-founded Adamant Technologies, which is a start-up aimed at personalizing the healthcare industry, which was started as part of the Johnson Group. The company, based out of San Francisco, has "developed a novel mobile chemical sensor device that allows users to track their health and fitness through chemicals in their breath." The company is currently working on a related smartphone application.

=== AIP Advances ===
Johnson is the Founding Executive Editor of AIP Advances, a peer-reviewed journal published by the American Institute of Physics.

== Honors and awards ==
Johnson received the Danforth Center Award for excellence as a teaching fellow at Harvard in 1987. He was a National Science Foundation fellow from 1984 to 1986, a European Union ESPRIT postdoctoral fellow from 1990 to 1992, a National Research Council postdoctoral fellow from 1992 to 1993, a David and Lucille Packard Foundation Science and Engineering fellow from 1994 to 1999, and an Alfred P. Sloan Research Fellow in 1995.

He received the Jack Raper Outstanding Technology Directions Paper Award in 1999, the Lindback Foundation Award for distinguished teaching at the University of Pennsylvania in 2003, the Dean's Award for Undergraduate Research Mentorship in 2011, and became a Fellow of the American Physical Society in 2011.

== See also ==
- Nanotechnology
- AIP Advances
- Graphene
- Carbon nanotubes
