= Judith Dawes =

Australian physicist and researcher

- Education: University of Sydney; University of Rochester
- Known for: Photonics; Opals
- Scientific career
- Workplaces: University of Toronto; Macquarie University

Judith M. Dawes is an Australian physicist who is Professor Emerita of Physics at Macquarie University. She studies the interactions of light at the nanoscale and the applications of lasers in sensing. She is a former president of the Australian Optical Society, and a Fellow of SPIE, Optica (formerly the Optical Society) and the Royal Society of NSW.

== Early life and education ==
Dawes grew up in a family of scientists, and became interested in the way that atoms form molecules. She studied chemistry, physics and mathematics at the University of Sydney. She was a Rotary International Foundation Fellow at the University of Rochester. She earned her doctoral degree in 1988. She joined the American Physical Society and Optica as a student in 1984. Dawes joined the University of Toronto as a postdoctoral researcher, and moved to Macquarie University in 1991.

== Research and career ==
Dawes became a Senior Lecturer at Macquarie University in 1995. She was promoted to Associate Professor in 2001, and Professor in 2016. Dawes is the Director of the MQ Photonics Research Centre, a Macquarie University Research Centre for optics and photonics. Her research considers the characterisation of absorption and emission in 3D photonic crystals known as opals. In these crystals, visible light cannot pass through large thicknesses, which is the basis of the optical band gap. Dawes developed the framework to create and characterise opals, inverse opals and opals that include waveguides for photonic devices. Dawes uses the waveguides for pump- probe measurements, in an effort to make efficient optical amplifiers for photonic chips. She also demonstrated that metal opals could be used for nanoplasmonics. She has used self-assembly to encourage the fabrication of large area opals without cracks. These cracks appear during annealing, and can be eliminated using a bi-capillary growth mechanism to encourage growth separately from solvent evaporation.

The photonic crystals developed by Dawes can include rare earth ion optical emitters and nanodiamonds that include colour centres. In general, Dawes creates the opals using self-assembly, starting with a suspension of polystyrene or microsphere of silica. It is important that the silica microspheres are monodisperse, and this is achieved during the Stober synthesis. To make inverse opals, Dawes creates polystyrene opals, and then infiltrates them using silica sol-gel. The remaining structures are baked at high temperatures to remove traces of polystyrene. By coating the microsphere with a high refractive index material life silver, and allowing the coated spheres to self-assemble into an opal, makes it possible to generate a complete band gap opal. To establish the impact of periodic environments on the emission profiles of nitrogen-vacancy centers in nanodiamonds, Dawes deposited them on the surfaces of her fabricated opals. Placing them in these periodic environments, or doping the opals with nanodiamonds, decreases the lifetime of the emitting species until they became single-photon sources. She found that lifetime variance is reduced for nitrogen-vacancy centers, which is not related to the size of the nanodiamond particles. The lifetime of these species appears to depend on the curvature of the substrate.

Dawes was a Chief Investigator of the Australian Research Council Centre for Ultrahigh Bandwidth Devices for Optical Systems (CUDOS). In her role at CUDOS she worked with the Optica student chapter to develop outreach activities to share their work in photonics with the general public. This included a photonics simulator, which was developed to help students build and communicate using optical networks, a laser maze and a series of programs for high school students.

Dawes developed Yb:YAB, a new laser material. She also worked on a new laser-cured protein solder for microsurgery, as well as thin film wave guides grown by liquid phase epitaxy.

=== Academic service ===
Dawes chairs the Macquarie University Faculty of Science and Engineering Women in STEM committee, is an elected member of the University Senate, and was elected to the Executive of Science and Technology Australia. She served as president of the Australian Optical Society in 2010–2012, and was Head of Department of Physics and Astronomy from 2013 to 2015. In 2018 Dawes was appointed Fellow of the SPIE, and in 2019 a Fellow of Optica. She has been featured in the SPIE Women in Optics planner. Dawes was elected as Director-at-Large to the Board of Optica for 2022-2024.

=== Selected publications ===
- Dawes, Judith (1995). "Ytterbium-doped silica fiber lasers: versatile sources for the 1-1.2 /spl mu/m region" (PDF). IEEE Journal of Selected Topics in Quantum Electronics. 1. doi:10.1109/2944.468377.
- Dawes, Judith (2013). "Single-nanocrystal sensitivity achieved by enhanced upconversion luminescence". Nature Photonics. 8 (10): 729–734. Bibcode:2013NatNa...8..729Z. doi:10.1038/nnano.2013.171. PMID 23995455.
- Dawes, Judith (2013). "Upconversion luminescence with tunable lifetime in NaYF4:Yb,Er nanocrystals: role of nanocrystal size". Nanoscale. 5 (3): 944–952. Bibcode:2013Nanos...5..944Z. doi:10.1039/C2NR32482B. PMID 23223581.
