= Ratko Janev =

Macedonian atomic physicist

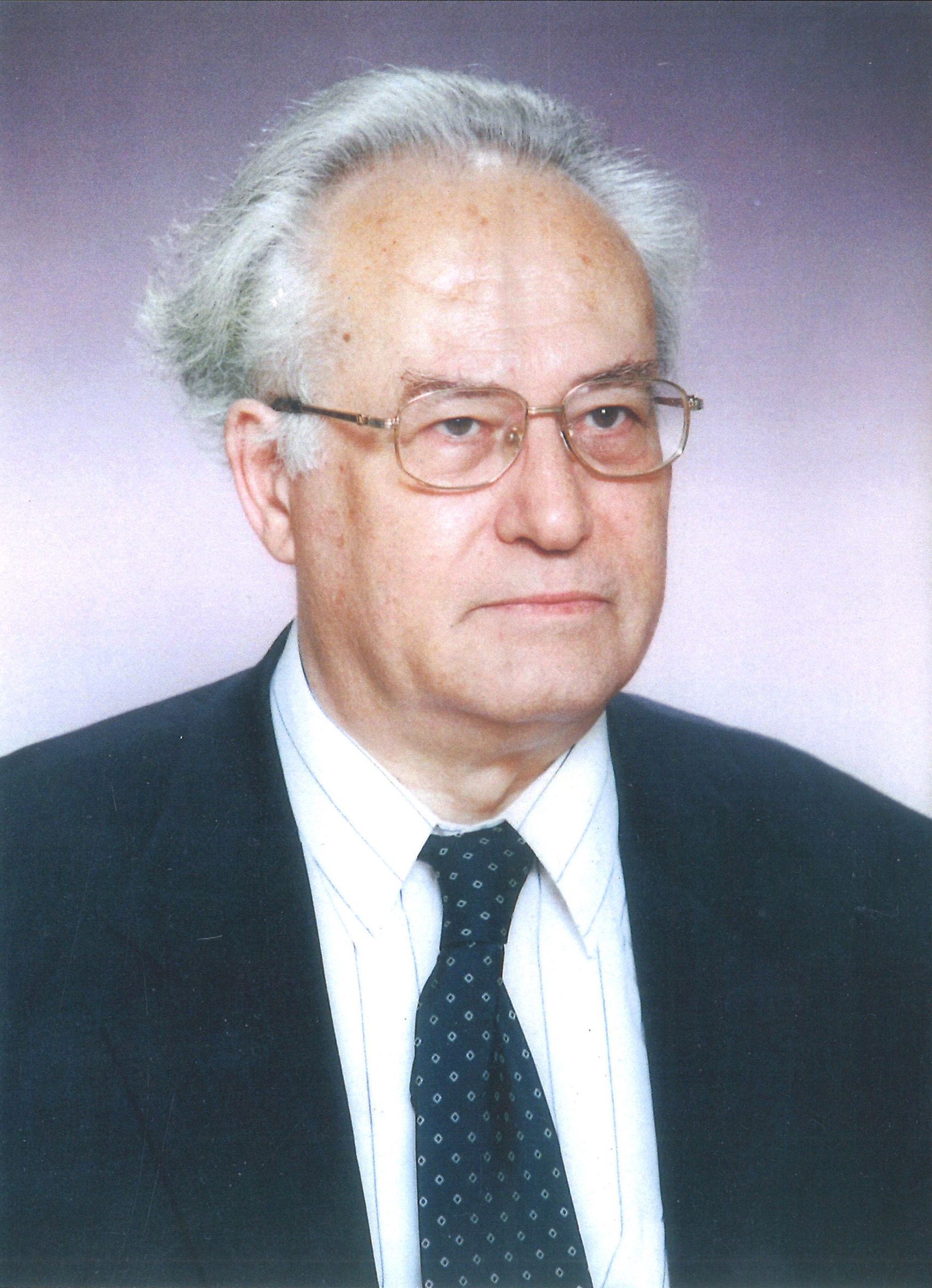
- Born: March 30, 1939; Sveti Vrach, Bulgaria
- Died: December 31, 2019 (aged 80); Belgrade, Serbia

Ratko Janev (Macedonian: Ратко Jанев) (March 30, 1939 – December 31, 2019) was a Yugoslav and Serbian atomic physicist and Macedonian academician.

== Biography ==
Janev was born on March 30, 1939, in Sveti Vrach, Bulgaria. During his youth he moved to Yugoslavia, where he graduated from a high school in Skopje in 1957 and then went on to study at the University of Belgrade, where he received a PhD degree in 1968. From 1965 he was an associate of the Vinča Nuclear Institute. From 1986 he was Head of the Atomic and Molecular Unit in the Nuclear Data Section of the International Atomic Energy Agency in Vienna.

In 1972, Janev became Adjunct Professor of Nuclear Physics at the University of Skopje and Professor of Theoretical Physics at the University of Belgrade. From 2002 to 2004 he worked at the Department of Plasma Physics in Jülich Research Centre, Germany.

Janev was a member of the Macedonian Academy of Sciences and Arts. In 2004 he received the Research Award from the Alexander von Humboldt Foundation for the project "Modelling and Diagnostics of Fusion Edge/Diverter Plasma" on the understanding of cold boundary layer plasmas in nuclear fusion reactors, performed in collaboration with the Research Centre.

== Publications ==
- Zhang, Song Bin; Wang, Jian Guo; Janev, R. K. (2010-01-12). "Crossover of Feshbach Resonances to Shape-Type Resonances in Electron-Hydrogen Atom Excitation with a Screened Coulomb Interaction". Physical Review Letters. 104 (2). American Physical Society (APS): 0230203. Bibcode:2010PhRvL.104b3203Z. doi:10.1103/physrevlett.104.023203. ISSN 0031-9007. PMID 20366593.
- Yang, Yu Kun; Wu, Yong; Qu, Yi Zhi; Wang, Jian Guo; Janev, R.K.; Zhang, Song Bin (2019). "Resonance studies using the contour deformation method in the complex momentum plane". Physics Letters A. 383 (16). Elsevier BV: 1929–1936. Bibcode:2019PhLA..383.1929Y. doi:10.1016/j.physleta.2019.03.028. ISSN 0375-9601. S2CID 133090889.
- Li, Jun; Zhang, Song Bin; Ye, Bang Jiao; Wang, Jian Guo; Janev, R. K. (2016). "Low energy electron-impact ionization of hydrogen atom for coplanar equal-energy-sharing kinematics in Debye plasmas". Physics of Plasmas. 23 (12). AIP Publishing: 123511. Bibcode:2016PhPl...23l3511L. doi:10.1063/1.4971451. ISSN 1070-664X.
- Janev, R.K.; Zhang, Songbin; Wang, Jianguo (2016). "Review of quantum collision dynamics in Debye plasmas". Matter and Radiation at Extremes. 1 (5): 237–248. arXiv:1606.00163. doi:10.1016/j.mre.2016.10.002. ISSN 2468-080X.
- Janev, R. K. (1995). Atomic and Molecular Processes in Fusion Edge Plasmas. Boston, MA: Springer US Imprint Springer. ISBN 978-1-4757-9321-5. OCLC 859586248.
- Zeng, S L; Liu, L; Wang, J G; Janev, R K (2008-06-23). "Atomic collisions with screened Coulomb interactions: excitation and electron capture in H^{+} + H collisions". Journal of Physics B: Atomic, Molecular and Optical Physics. 41 (13) 135202. IOP Publishing. Bibcode:2008JPhB...41m5202Z. doi:10.1088/0953-4075/41/13/135202. ISSN 0953-4075. S2CID 121010993.
- Qi, Y. Y.; Wang, J. G.; Janev, R. K. (2008-12-31). "Bound-bound transitions in hydrogenlike ions in Debye plasmas". Physical Review A. 78 (6) 062511. American Physical Society (APS). Bibcode:2008PhRvA..78f2511Q. doi:10.1103/physreva.78.062511. ISSN 1050-2947.
- "Atomska fizika" (Atomic physics), 1972
- Janev, Ratko K.; Presnyakov, Leonid P.; Shevelko, Vjatcheslav P. (1985). Physics of Highly Charged Ions. Berlin, Heidelberg: Springer Berlin Heidelberg. doi:10.1007/978-3-642-69195-9. ISBN 978-3-642-69197-3.
- Janev, R.K.; Reiter, D. (2003). "Unified analytic representation of hydrocarbon impurity collision cross-sections". Journal of Nuclear Materials. 313–316. Elsevier BV: 1202–1205. Bibcode:2003JNuM..313.1202J. doi:10.1016/s0022-3115(02)01569-6. ISSN 0022-3115.
- "Atomska fizika" (Atomic physics), MANU, Skopje, 2012.
- Atomic_and_plasma_material_interaction https://books.google.com/books/about/Atomic_and_plasma_material_interaction_p.html?id=rSNRAAAAMAAJ&redir_esc=y
- Collision Processes of Hydrocarbon Species in Hydrogen Plasmas https://www.amazon.co.uk/Collision-Processes-Hydrocarbon-Species-Hydrogen/dp/B0019T6NK2/ref=sr_1_2?s=books&ie=UTF8&qid=1349889726&sr=1-2
