= Journal of Rheology =

- Discipline: Physics
- Language: English
- Edited by: Dimitris Vlassopoulos

Publication details
- Former name(s): Journal of Rheology (1929–1932); Physics/Journal of Applied Physics (1933–1939); Transactions of The Society of Rheology (1957–1977)
- History: 1929–present
- Publisher: American Institute of Physics (USA)
- Frequency: bimonthly
- Impact factor: 4.408 (2020)

Standard abbreviations
- ISO 4: J. Rheol.

Indexing
- CODEN: JORHD2
- ISSN: 0148-6055
- LCCN: 78646482
- OCLC no.: 3526986

Links
- Journal homepage

Journal of Rheology is a peer-reviewed scientific journal publishing original (primary) research on all aspects of rheology, the study of those properties of materials which determine their response to mechanical force. It is published bi-monthly by the Society of Rheology through the American Institute of Physics.

The editor-in-chief of Journal of Rheology is Dimitris Vlassopoulos.

== Publication history ==
The publication of Journal of Rheology has seen three phases. The journal was first published as Journal of Rheology between 1929 and 1932. In 1933 the journal was subsumed as a section (called Rheology Numbers) of the journal Physics, and then the Journal of Applied Physics. From 1957, the Society of Rheology reestablished the journal as a separate publication, initially named Transactions of the Society of Rheology, renamed Journal of Rheology from 1977.

== Abstracting and indexing ==
Journal of Rheology is abstracted and indexed in the following databases:

- Chemical Abstracts Service – CASSI
- Science Citation Index – Web of Science
- Engineering Index
- Applied Mechanics Reviews
- RAPRA Abstracts
- Physics Abstracts
- SPIN

== See also ==
- Journal of Applied Physics
- List of scientific journals in physics
