= Applied Physics Reviews =

Scientific journal

- Discipline: Physics
- Language: English
- Edited by: Chennupati Jagadish, Luigi Longobardi, Fengxia Geng, Martin L. Green, Laura Herz, Roger Narayan, Sefaattin Tongay, T. Venkatesan, David A. Weitz

Publication details
- History: 1980–present
- Publisher: American Institute of Physics (United States)
- Frequency: Annually
- Impact factor: 10.8 (2025)

Standard abbreviations
- ISO 4: Appl. Phys. Rev.

Indexing
- CODEN: APRPG5
- ISSN: 1931-9401
- LCCN: 2006214637
- OCLC no.: 68940641

Links
- Journal homepage

Applied Physics Reviews is a quarterly peer-reviewed scientific journal publishing original research and reviews of topics of experimental or theoretical research in applied physics and applications of physics to other branches of science and engineering. Originally a part of the Journal of Applied Physics, Applied Physics Reviews began being published independently in January 2014 with volume numbering restarting at 1. From 2014 to 2019 the editorial board was managed by the editors-in-chief John M. Poate (Colorado School of Mines) and Bill R. Appleton (University of Florida). Starting from 2019 summer, Chennupati Jagadish and Luigi Longobardi have assumed the office. According to the Journal Citation Reports, the journal has a 2025 impact factor of 10.8.

== Article types ==
The journal publishes "regular reviews" (comprehensive reviews covering established areas in-depth) and "focused reviews" (concise reviews covering new and emerging areas of science). The journal started publishing original research starting 2019.

== Abstracting and indexing ==
The journal is abstracted and indexed in the Science Citation Index, and Current Contents/Physical Chemical and Earth Sciences.
