= Peter Hänggi =

Swiss physicist (born 1950)

- Born: November 29, 1950 (age 75); Bärschwil, Switzerland
- Citizenship: Switzerland and Germany
- Education: University of Basel
- Known for: Stochastic resonance Brownian motor Hänggi's law
- Scientific career
- Fields: Physics; Statistical physics Dissipative systems
- Workplaces: Polytechnic Institute of New York University; University of Illinois Urbana–Champaign; University of Augsburg

Peter Hänggi (born November 29, 1950) is a theoretical physicist from Switzerland, Professor of Theoretical Physics at the University of Augsburg. He is best known for his original works on Brownian motion and the Brownian motor concept, stochastic resonance and dissipative systems (classical and quantum mechanical). Other topics include, driven quantum tunneling, such as the discovery of coherent destruction of tunneling (CDT), phononics, reaction rate theory, relativistic statistical mechanics and the foundations of classical and quantum thermodynamics.

== Career ==
He studied physics and was awarded B.Sc. (1972), M.Sc. (1974) and Ph.D. degrees (1977) at the University of Basel.

He was a Postgraduate Research Associate at the University of California, San Diego (1979–80), Assistant Professor of Physics, Polytechnic Institute of New York, New York (1980–1983), Associate Professor, Polytechnic Institute of New York, New York (1983–1987) and full professor at the University of Augsburg (1986 to 2019) and is since then professor emeritus there.

== Hänggi's law ==
The following statement is attributed as Hänggi's law:

The more trivial your research, the more people will read it and agree.

It is labeled as a kind of Murphy's law and it was first quoted in Arthur Bloch's work.

Corollaries:

- The more vital your research, the fewer people will understand it.
- You write a nontrivial paper and you likely will be the only one who will remember it.

== Honors and awards ==
He was elected a Fellow of the American Physical Society in 1988 "for distinguished contributions to nonlinear statistical physics and reaction rate theory and for elucidating the influence of non-Markovian memory effects and dissipative tunneling in equilibrium and non equilibrium systems".

In 2003, he was elected to membership in the German National Academy of Sciences Leopoldina, on October 14, 2005, elected membership in American Association for the Advancement of Sciences (AAAS) for distinguished contributions to the field of reaction rate theory and stochastic resonance and for discovering coherent destruction of tunneling and Brownian motors, October 2007 elected membership in the Academia Europaea (AE), 2014 elected membership in European Academy of Sciences (EURASC) and in 2015 elected foreign honorary membership in the Academia Română, in 2024 elected to the Industry Academy in the section International Artificial Intelligence Industry Alliance (AIIA).

Peter Hänggi is a recipient of a number of scientific prizes including

- Smoluchowski Honorary Medal from Jagiellonian University (2006),
- Lindhard Lecture (2010),
- Lars Onsager Lecture and Onsager Medal (2011),
- Distinguished scientist award and David Ben Gurion medal, Ben-Gurion University of the Negev, Israel (10.12.2014)
- Blaise Pascal Medal (2018),
- 2019 Marian Smoluchowski and Emil Warburg Prize for Physics by the German Physical Society (DPG) and the Polish Physical Society (PTF), and
- 2023 Lars Onsager prize recipient of the American Physical Society (APS) for "For the development of Brownian motors and pioneering contributions to nonequilibrium statistical physics, relativistic and quantum thermodynamics."
- 2024 Honorary Medal De scientia et humanitate optime meritis by the Czech Academy of Sciences

== Notable review papers ==
- Hänggi, Peter; Talkner, Peter; Borkovec, Michal (1990-04-01). "Reaction-rate theory: fifty years after Kramers". Reviews of Modern Physics. 62 (2): 251–341. Bibcode:1990RvMP...62..251H. doi:10.1103/RevModPhys.62.251.
- Gammaitoni, Luca; Hänggi, Peter; Jung, Peter; Marchesoni, Fabio (1998-01-01). "Stochastic resonance". Reviews of Modern Physics. 70 (1): 223–287. Bibcode:1998RvMP...70..223G. doi:10.1103/RevModPhys.70.223.
- Hänggi, Peter; Marchesoni, Fabio (2009-01-01). "Artificial Brownian motors: Controlling transport on the nanoscale". Reviews of Modern Physics. 83 (1): 387–442. arXiv:0807.1283. Bibcode:2009RvMP...81..387H. doi:10.1103/RevModPhys.81.387. S2CID 16690300.
- Campisi, Michele; Hänggi, Peter; Talkner, Peter (2011-07-06). "Quantum fluctuation relations: Foundations and applications". Reviews of Modern Physics. 83 (3): 771–791. arXiv:1012.2268. doi:10.1103/RevModPhys.83.771. S2CID 119200058.
- Li, Nianbei; Ren, Jie; Wang, Lei; Zhang, Gang; Hänggi, Peter; Li, Baowen (2012-07-17). "Phononics: Manipulating heat flow with electronic analogs and beyond". Reviews of Modern Physics. 84 (3): 1045–1066. arXiv:1108.6120. doi:10.1103/RevModPhys.84.1045. S2CID 2244763.
- Grifoni, Milena; Hänggi, Peter (2008-10-01). "Driven Quantum Tunnelling". Physics Reports. 304 (5–6): 229–354. doi:10.1016/S0370-1573(98)00022-2.
- Talkner, Peter; Hänggi, Peter (2020-10-21). "Statistical mechanics and thermodynamics at strong coupling: Quantum and classical". Reviews of Modern Physics. 62 (4): 041002-1 – 041002-26. arXiv:1911.11660. doi:10.1103/RevModPhys.92.041002. S2CID 208290906.
