= APLL =

APLL may refer to:

- The Academy of Persian Language and Literature
- An analog phase-locked loop
- APL Logistics - a Japan-based freight and forwarding company
