= Seth Ariel Tongay =

American scientist

- Born: Seth Tongay; 1980 (age 45–46); Germany
- Education: Bilkent University (MSc); University of Florida (PhD)
- Known for: Discovery of Quasi-1D Materials, Alloying science in 2D, Janus materials, excitonics of 2D materials, catalytic polymers
- Awards: Presidential Early Career Award for Scientists and Engineers; Ten Outstanding Young Persons of the World; Fellow of the Royal Society of Chemistry; Fellow of the Institute of Physics; American Physical Society Fellow; NSF CAREER Award; Jewish National Fund Fellowship
- Scientific career
- Fields: Quantum materials, nanotechnology, electronics, 2D materials
- Workplaces: Arizona State University; University of California, Berkeley; Stanford University

Seth Ariel Tongay is a Jewish-American materials engineer internationally recognized for discovery of new semiconductor materials for next-generation electronic devices and materials manufacturing towards civilian and national security applications. He was awarded the Presidential Early Career Award for Scientists and Engineers in 2019 by President Donald Trump and the White House. He has been recognized as a Fellow of the American Physical Society in the United States and a Fellow of the Royal Society of Chemistry and Fellow of the Institute of Physics in the United Kingdom.

He is one of the research directors at the College of Engineering and the chair of Materials Science and Engineering at Arizona State University. He serves as an associate editor at the American Institute of Physics (AIP) Applied Physics Reviews and Nature 2D materials & applications by Nature.

== Recognition ==
His work received several prestigious awards including one from the President of the United States Donald Trump Presidential Early Career Award for Scientists and Engineers given to outstanding scientists and engineers in the U.S. by the White House. His work has resulted in the prestigious National Science Foundation CAREER Award and the Ten Outstanding Young Persons of the World award. From 2019 to 2023, his work has seen him identified as one of the most influential researchers over the past decade by Clarivate Analytics and Web of Science. Google Scholar statistics independently identified him as one of the top 10 researchers in the world in the area of quantum materials and the top 50 in two-dimensional materials.

== Research and career ==
He earned doctorate degree at the University of Florida where he studied materials physics working with Prof. Dr. Arthur F. Hebard and a postdoctoral fellowship in materials science and engineering at the University of California, Berkeley and Stanford with Prof. Dr. Junqiao Wu. He is known for his patent integrating conductive graphene into flexible displays, solar cells, and touch screens. His notable and most cited work includes synthesis of 2D and quantum materials, 2D Janus materials, the discovery of quasi-1D materials including Rhenium disulfide (ReS₂), graphene-based high-power devices, and graphene solar cells. His research often uses alloying, defects engineering, dopants, and manufacturing techniques to create a new set of functionalities. His other seminal contributions discovery of exciton complexes in ultra-thin 2D semiconductors.

He has participated in major government and state-level initiatives. In late 2023, the U.S. federal government selected his team within the White House initiative, the CHIPS Act, to initiate the development of manufacturing processes for next-generation semiconductors, catering to future electronics and infrared technologies. Lab-to-fab integration efforts are funded by Intel and Applied Materials. The State of Arizona has awarded the Arizona Water Innovation Initiative, which aims to develop innovative and manufacturable engineering solutions for accessing clean water.

== Awards and honors ==
- 2024 Fellow of the Institute of Physics
- 2024 Fellow of the American Physical Society
- 2024 Fellow of the Royal Society of Chemistry
- 2019-2024 Highly Cited Researchers Award by Web of Science and Clarivate Analytics
- 2023 Navrotsky Professor Fellow
- 2022 College of Engineering Teaching Award
- 2021 Lamonte H. Lawrence Professor Fellow in Solid State Science
- 2021 Sigma Xi Full member
- 2019 Presidential Early Career Award for Scientists and Engineers (PECASE) Awards
- 2019 Ten Outstanding Young Persons of the World – Academic Leadership and Accomplishment
- 2019 World Nobel Laureates Association Young Scientists Award
- 2019 Associate Editor at Applied Physics Reviews
- 2017 Top Reviewer Award by Chemistry of Materials American Chemical Society
- 2017-2023 Teaching Award by Arizona State University
- 2016 The Scientist of the Year Award by Science Heroes Association
- 2016 National Science Foundation CAREER Awards
