= Susan Pond =

Australian scientist and technologist

Professor Susan Pond AM FRSN FTSE FAHMS FRACP FAICD
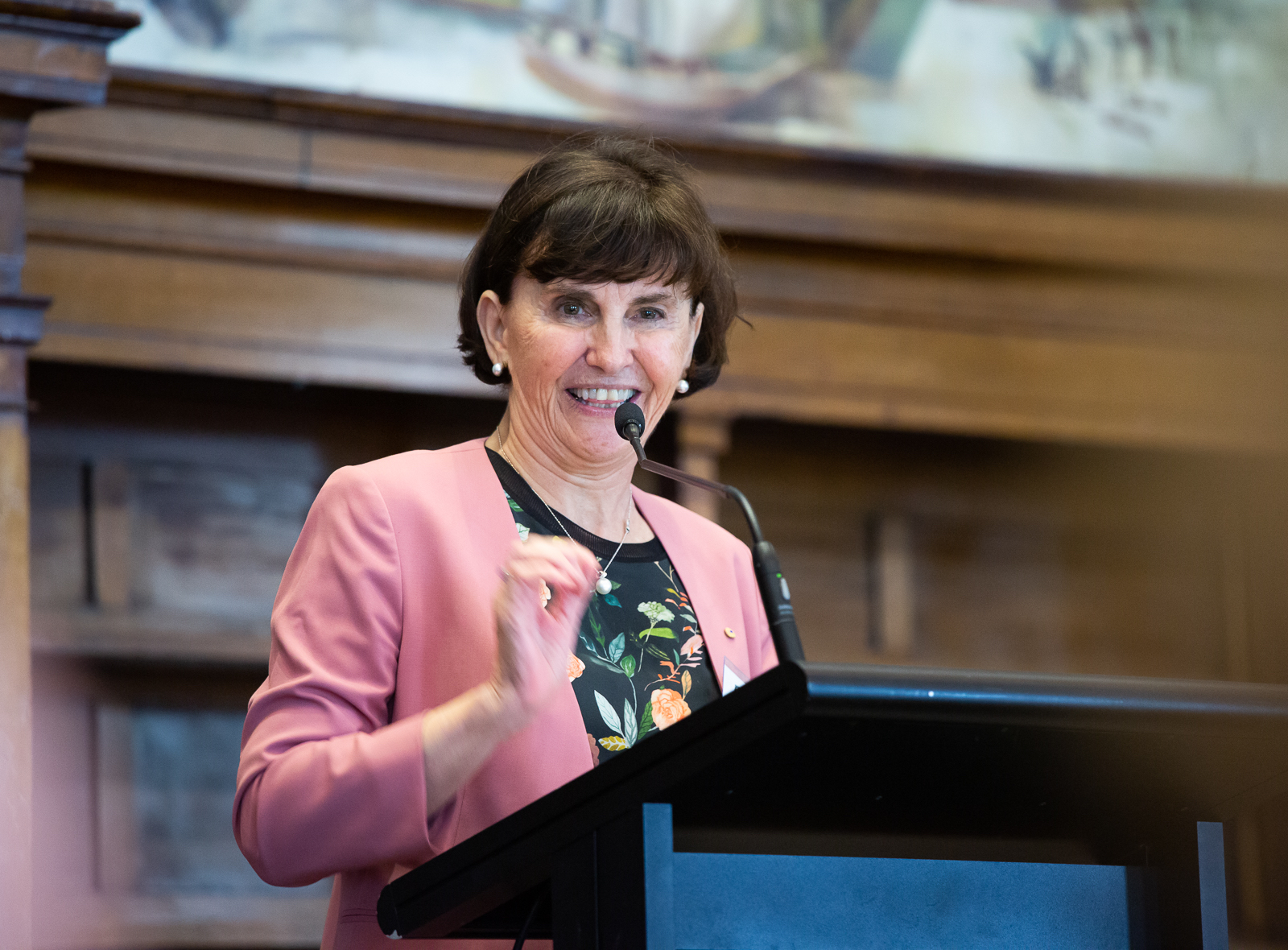
- Susan Pond
- Awards: Member of the Order of Australia (1994); Centenary Medal (2001)

Academic background
- Education: University of Sydney; University of New South Wales; University of Queensland

Academic work
- Institutions: University of Queensland
- Website: https://www.nssn.org.au/susan-pond

Susan Margaret Pond is an Australian physician, scientist, company director and community volunteer with deep expertise in biotechnology. She is recognised for her national and international contributions to academia, business, government and civil society. She is past president of the Royal Society of New South Wales.

== Early life and education ==
Born in Sydney, Susan Pond qualified in medicine at the University of Sydney, receiving the Bachelor of Medicine and Bachelor of Surgery degrees in 1969 and qualification as a specialist physician through the Royal Australasian College of Physicians in 1974. She undertook postgraduate research at the University of New South Wales, where she was awarded the Doctor of Medicine degree. In 1998, the University of Queensland awarded her the Doctor of Science degree.

== Career ==
From 1977 - 1984, Dr Pond was a post-doctoral research Fellow for two years and then Assistant Professor of Medicine for six years at the University of California San Francisco . She attained American Board qualifications in Medicine and Medical Toxicology. Susan returned to Australia in 1985 to take up the position of Associate Professor of Medicine and Clinical Pharmacology at the University of Queensland.

Susan was the first woman to be appointed to a Personal Professorial Chair in the Department of Medicine at the University of Queensland (1990), and the first woman to receive the Wellcome Australia Medal (1992). She was a senior executive in Johnson & Johnson Research Pty Limited from 1997 - 2002 becoming the first female Managing Director of a Johnson & Johnson Company in Australia (2003 - 2009). From 2010 - 2016, Susan led the Renewable Transport Fuels Program at the United States Studies Centre, focussing mainly on renewable aviation fuels. From February 2017 to May 2018 she was the director of Sydney Nano (The University of Sydney Nano Institute).

From 1985 - 1996, Dr Pond served on many Therapeutic Goods Administration Advisory Committees and from1994 to 1996 she as chairman of the Australian Drug Evaluation Committee. While at Johnson & Johnson, she was the first corporate member to the elected to the Ausbiotech Limited Board (2004) on which she served as chairman from 2006-2009.

Since 2010, Dr Pond has served as an independent, non-executive director on many government, biotechnology company, and not-for-profit boards including the Australian Nuclear Science and Technology Organisation, Academy of Technological Sciences and Engineering, Australian Institute for Bioengineering and Nanotechnology, Centenary Institute, Trusted Autonomous Systems for Defence Cooperative Research Centre, Phenomics Australia, and Council of the Queensland University of Technology. Susan served as the inaugural Chair of the NSW Smart Sensing Network (NSSN) from 2017 - 2022.

Previous positions have included: adjunct professor, faculty of engineering and information technologies, University of Sydney; Chairman & Managing Director of Johnson & Johnson Research Pty Limited; Adjunct Professor in Sustainability, United States Studies Centre at the University of Sydney; Professor of Medicine at the University of Queensland 1984–1996.

== Distinctions and awards ==
Susan Pond is a Fellow of the Royal Society of New South Wales, the Australian Academy of Technological Sciences and Engineering, the Australian Academy of Health and Medical Sciences, Royal Australasian College of Physicians, and Australian Institute of Company Directors.

She was made a Member of the Order of Australia in the 1994 Australia Day Honours for services to Clinical Pharmacology and Toxicology and in 2001 was awarded a Centenary Medal for service to Australian society in therapeutics.

In 2013 she was awarded the Doctor of Medicine degree honoris causa by the University of Queensland and in the same year she was named as one of Australia's Top 100 Women of Influence by The Australian Financial Review.

Pond served as Vice President of the Australian Academy of Technological Sciences and Engineering, and Chair of the Australian Government's Clean Technology committee.

In April 2021 Pond was elected President of the Royal Society of New South Wales, only the third woman to be elected to the post.
