= Service plan =

Type of extended warranty

A service plan is an optional warranty that is offered to purchasers of products for an additional fee. They provide coverage for issues not covered by a base warranty.

== Differences from warranties ==
A service plan is a separate policy from the manufacturer's warranty. While the typical service plan does require preventative and routine maintenance to be taken in accordance with the manufacturer's warranty, it does not actually require a product to fail or malfunction under the same conditions. Service plans are also active from the date of purchase, unlike extended warranties, which become active when the manufacturer's warranty expires, meaning products can be purchased with service plans that is before or at the same time as the manufacturer's warranty.

The key distinction is that a warranty strictly covers defects in workmanship and materials, while service plans cover product failure in general with a list of exclusions. While the exclusion list includes most situations that would disqualify a product from warranty coverage, there are things that fall outside the product's condition that aren't excluded, such as power surges. However, this is offset by the infrequency of covered conditions, and misinterpretation. For example, a lightning strike is considered an environmental cause, and consequently is excluded from most service plans, even if they claim power surge protection.

To help differentiate from manufacturer's warranties, service plans occasionally come with additional benefits, such coverage for theft or accidental damage, replacements if a product fails a given number of times ("no lemon policy"), access to additional services, priority service and technical support.

== Methods of service ==
Service plans vary in how an item is serviced. Some items may be serviced by the retailer's technicians, some may be sent out for repair, some may ship a replacement to the customer, some may be replaced by the retailer with a new item from the store inventory, or exchanged for store credit.

Generally, if an item can be serviced in-store by the retailer, it will be. Some items like home theater equipment are repaired on-site with the retailer covering the cost. If the product can't be serviced by local technicians, then the items are sent to the manufacturer to be serviced. If the item is not serviceable or service is too expensive, the retailer will simply replace the product, or issue store credit for a newer model.

== Economics ==
Whether an extended service plan is worth the extra cost depends on the item and the perceived value by the consumer. Basic service plans on desktop computers, for example, typically come close to the actual average repair cost of a system, with the retailer using the service plan as a way to keep the customer from going to a competing service center. Support options can be beneficial to consumers who are unfamiliar with the use and maintenance of a computer.

Replacement options may present an advantage over an RMA if the customer is disrupted enough by a product's absence (such as computer upgrades), but the low failure rate of the products and the ability to buy temporary substitutes usually offsets the price. Some items such as low-end headphones may consistently fail before the end of the coverage period, which can be advantageous.

== Presence among retailers ==
Service plans are seen mainly in office stores and electronics retailers, largely because of perceived fragility of electronics hardware and insecurity over the use of refurbished product. Some items such as computers and sale items produce very little profit for retailers, so selling service plans and accessories is essential to profiting from the transaction (see Loss leader). In these cases, service plans are usually bundled with additional high-margin services, such as phone support, at reduced prices to add to the perceived value of purchasing them.

== See also ==
- break/fix, the 'fee-for-service alternative to a service plan in commercial IT environments
