= Ben Eggleton =

Australian scientist & academic

Benjamin J. Eggleton
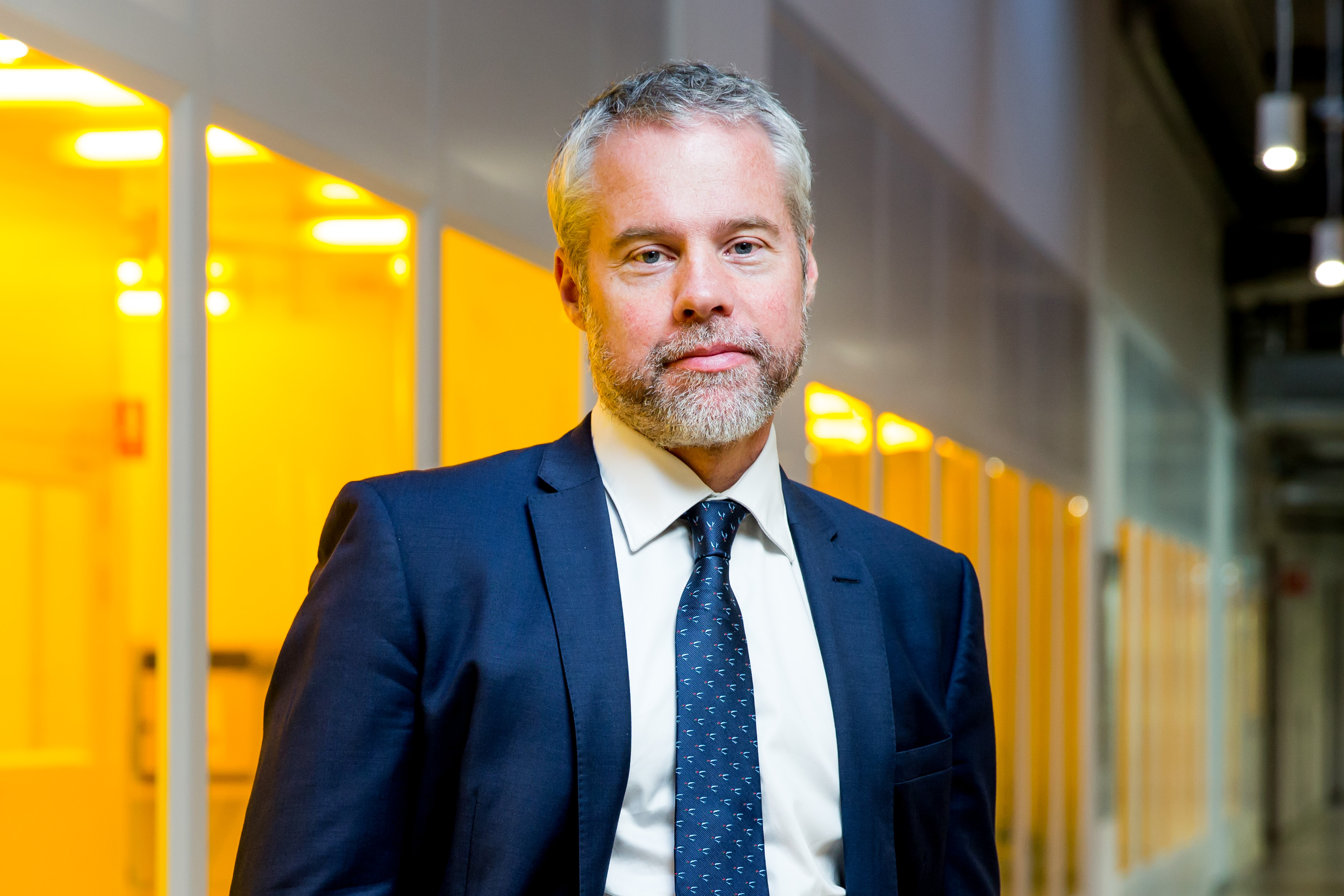
- Born: 6 November 1970 (age 56); Sydney, Australia
- Education: University of Sydney
- Awards: Australian Laureate Fellowship (2012)
- Scientific career
- Fields: Photonics; Nanophotonics; Optics; Physics; Nonlinear optics

Benjamin John Eggleton, FAA FTSE FRSN, (born 6 November 1970) is Professor in the School of Physics at the University of Sydney, where he leads a research group in integrated photonics, nonlinear optics and smart sensors and serves as co-director of the NSW Smart Sensing Network (NSSN).

== Education and career ==
Eggleton obtained the bachelor's degree (with honours) in Science in 1992 and PhD degree in physics from the University of Sydney in 1996. In 1996, he joined Bell Laboratories, Lucent Technologies as a Postdoctoral Member of Staff in the Optical Physics Department under the supervision of Dr Richart E. Slusher. In 1998 he transferred to the Optical Fiber Research Department as a Member of Technical Staff and was promoted to Technical Manager of the Fiber Gratings Group in 2000. He was then promoted to Research Director within the Specialty Fiber Business Division of Bell Laboratories, where he was engaged in forward-looking research supporting Lucent Technologies business in optical fiber devices.

Eggleton returned to the University of Sydney in 2003 as a full Professor and ARC Federation Fellowship in the School of Physics. He was founding Director of the ARC Centre of Excellence for Ultrahigh bandwidth Devices for Optical Systems (CUDOS) and served as Director from 2003 to 2017.

In 2009 Eggleton established the Institute of Photonics and Optical Science (IPOS) at the University of Sydney and was the Director from 2009 to 2018. He was an ARC Laureate Fellow and an ARC Federation Fellowship twice.

In 2016 Eggleton and Gooding established the NSW Smart Sensing Network (NSSN) as the inaugural NSW Innovation Network. Eggleton currently serves as co-director of NSSN.

From 2018 to 2022, Eggleton was Director of the University of Sydney Nano Institute (Sydney Nano).

Since 2022 he has served as Pro-Vice-Chancellor (Research) at the University of Sydney. The Pro-Vice-Chancellor (Research) has executive responsibility for pivotal areas of the university's Research Portfolio relating to research policy, performance and conduct including clinical trials, research reporting and compliance. The role has responsibility for research integrity and ethics management.

== Research ==
Eggleton's research links fundamental to applied science and spans physics and engineering. He has made pioneering contributions to nonlinear optics and all-optical signal processing with recent breakthrough achievements in the nonlinear optics of periodic media, slow-light in photonic crystals and ultrafast planar waveguide nonlinear optics. His research into new classes of nonlinear waveguides has created a new paradigm for photonic chip based ultrafast optical signal processing and his group holds various world records.

Eggleton's breakthroughs in the nonlinear optics of chalcogenide glasses have led to his demonstrations of new ultrafast optical devices for telecommunications applications, record low-threshold supercontinuum generation sources and on-chip parametric sources. His group reported the first demonstration of on-chip stimulated Brillouin scattering, and holds the record for on-chip SBS gain. His fundamental breakthroughs include the first demonstrations of Bragg soliton and Gap soliton formation in periodic media and of slow-light-enhanced nonlinear optics in photonic crystals.

== Publications ==
Eggleton is the author and coauthor of more than 580 journal publications, including articles in Nature Photonics, Nature Physics, Nature Communications, Physical Review Letters, Science and Optica and over 300 invited presentations. His journal papers have been cited 29,000 times according to Web of Science with an h-number of 93 (129 in Google Scholar) and has filed over 45 patents.

== Awards and honours ==
Eggleton is a Fellow of the Optical Society of America (OSA), IEEE Photonics, the Australian Academy of Technological Sciences and Engineering (ATSE), and the Australian Academy of Science (AAS).

Eggleton has received numerous awards for his contributions, including, the 2020 WH "Beattie" Steel Medal from the Australian and New Zealand Optical Society (ANZOS), the 2011 Walter Boas Medal from the Australian Institute of Physics, the Eureka Prize for Leadership in Science, the 2008 NSW Physicist of the Year medal, the 2007 Pawsey Medal from the Australian Academy of Science, the 2004 Malcolm McIntosh Prize for Physical Scientist of the Year, the 2003 International Commission on Optics (ICO) Prize, the 1998 Adolph Lomb Medal from OSA, the Distinguished Lecturer Award from the IEEE/LEOS, and the R&D100 Award. In 2012, he was awarded an Australian Laureate Fellowship. Eggleton was recipient of the 2017 University of Sydney Vice Chancellors Award for Outstanding Research.

Eggleton, together with a team of researchers from the University of Sydney and the Australian National University, won the Australian Museum's 2020 Defence Science and Technology Eureka Prize for Outstanding Science in Safeguarding Australia. In 2022 Eggleton was recognized as Academic of the Year at the 2022 Defence Industry Awards.

Eggleton was President of the Australian Optical Society from 2008 to 2010. He was Editor-in-Chief for Optics Communications from 2007 to 2015 and was the Editor-in-Chief for APL Photonics from 2016-2025. Eggleton served on the Board of Governors for the IEEE Photonics Society from 2015 to 2017
