= Area Police/Private Security Liaison =

APPL, or the Area Police/Private Security Liaison program, was created in New York City in 1986 to create a better working relationship between public and private security. It was formed by the NYPD commissioner and four former NYPD chiefs who had become leaders in the private security community. Part of its work involved overcoming the mutual distrust between public police and private security; the former typically looked upon the latter as being ill-trained and uneducated, while the latter resented being treated as less than professional enforcement officers. The police training curriculum was revised to include private security awareness discussions, and police were invited to visit private security organizations. The police academy also began teaching a course on police science for private security first-line supervisors. Private security and police also met regularly to discuss crime trends and to share information.

The NYPD has created NYPD SHIELD, which their Police Commissioner has called "our flagship program for partnership with New York City’s private security managers."
