= University of Sydney Nano Institute =

Australian institute for nanoscale science

The University of Sydney Nano Institute
- Established: March 2016; 10 years ago
- Faculty: University of Sydney
- Formerly called: Australian Institute for Nanoscale Science and Technology (AINST)
- Location: Sydney, Australia
- Website: http://sydney.edu.au/nano

The University of Sydney Nano Institute (Sydney Nano) is a multidisciplinary research institute at the University of Sydney in Camperdown, Sydney, Australia. It focuses on multidisciplinary research in nanoscale science and technology. It is one of ten multidisciplinary research institutes at the University of Sydney, along with the Charles Perkins Centre and the Brain and Mind Centre.

== Location and facilities ==
Sydney Nano is headquartered at the Sydney Nanoscience Hub. It was built for nanoscience research and opened in 2015 on the University of Sydney's Camperdown/Darlington campus.

== History ==
Sydney Nano was originally launched in April 2016, as the Australian Institute for Nanoscale Science and Technology (AINST). The institute was renamed The University of Sydney Nano Institute in November 2017.

In July 2017, the University of Sydney announced a multi-year partnership with Microsoft to conduct research into quantum computing and the official establishment of Microsoft Quantum - Sydney at the Sydney Nanoscience Hub.

In March 2018, the New South Wales Government provided a A$500,000 grant to set up the Sydney Quantum Academy to strengthen postgraduate research and training in quantum computing. The academy is led by the University of Sydney in partnership with Macquarie University, the University of New South Wales and the University of Technology, Sydney.

== Directors ==
The director of Sydney Nano is Stephen Bartlett. The institute was initially jointly led by three interim directors, Thomas Maschmeyer, Simon Ringer, and Zdenka Kuncic, who oversaw the launch period of the institute from March 2016.

Susan Pond was appointed to the directorship in February 2017, for a period of 12 months.

Ben Eggleton served as director from May 2018 to December 2022, when Alice Motion was appointed interim director for six months.
