= Athletic Propulsion Labs =

American footwear company

Athletic Propulsion Labs (APL) is an American clothing company that specializes in sneakers. Its first shoe, the APL Concept 1, was banned from the National Basketball Association (NBA) for providing an undue competitive advantage.

== History ==
APL was founded in 2009 by Adam and Ryan Goldston, identical twins, and is based in Los Angeles. The company was started when the Goldstons were students and athletes at the University of Southern California. Its first shoe, the APL Concept 1, included eight compression springs to give extra vertical jump height to the wearer. After advertising the shoe in a double-page Slam magazine advertisement, many NBA players, agents, relatives, and the league itself reached out to the company to learn more. The NBA in 2010 banned the Concept 1 from all league functions, including games, for providing an undue competitive advantage; it was the first time the league had banned a sneaker model for performance reasons. Many NBA and WNBA players bought the Concept 1 shoes anyway, and the company continued to produce performance and luxury apparel from then on.

APL has two flagship retail stores: one at The Grove at Farmers Market in LA, which opened in 2019, and one in SoHo, Manhattan, which opened in 2023. Their products are also sold at Nordstrom, Selfridges, Net-A-Porter, Shopbop, Lane Crawford, and Harvey Nichols.

== Endorsements and sponsorships ==
Sofia Richie and members of the Kardashian family are fans of APL shoes. Oprah Winfrey named the APL Lusso Slides to her 2021 Oprah's Favorite Things list. The company has partnered with Nastia Liukin to release limited-edition sneakers in 2021 and 2024. John Cena has been seen at WWE events and public appearances in APL sneakers.

APL is the official footwear partner for Red Bull Racing; Formula One driver Sergio Pérez has been seen wearing the company's sneakers.
