= Sydney Nanoscience Hub =

Australian nanoscience facility

Coordinates: 33.8880417°S 151.187686°E

The Sydney Nanoscience Hub is a nanoscience facility of The University of Sydney Nano Institute (formerly the Australian Institute for Nanoscale Science and Technology) at the University of Sydney in Camperdown, Sydney, Australia. The laboratories in the building are isolated from outside influences such as vibration, electromagnetic fluctuations, temperature and atmospheric pressure variation, the air in the laboratories is also filtered to be free of dust.

== History ==
The facility opened in April 2016. Construction cost AU$150 million; the Australian federal government's Commonwealth Education Infrastructure Fund contributed AU$40 million. Microsoft has invested in a quantum computing research facility.
