= Journal of Vacuum Science and Technology =

- Discipline: Physics
- Language: English
- Edited by: Eray Aydil

Publication details
- History: 1964–present
- Publisher: American Institute of Physics on behalf of the American Vacuum Society (United States)
- Frequency: Bimonthly
- Impact factor: 2.4 (Part A); 1.5 (Part B) (2023)

Standard abbreviations
- ISO 4: J. Vac. Sci. Technol.

Indexing
- Journal of Vacuum Science and Technology
- ISSN: 0022-5355
- Journal of Vacuum Science and Technology A
- CODEN: JVTAD6
- ISSN: 0734-2101 (print); 1520-8559 (web)
- LCCN: 83643441
- OCLC no.: 08697396
- Journal of Vacuum Science and Technology B
- CODEN: JVTBD9
- ISSN: 0734-211X
- LCCN: 83642371
- OCLC no.: 08697479

Links
- Journal homepage; Part A; Part B

The Journal of Vacuum Science and Technology is a peer-reviewed scientific journal published in two parts, A and B, by the American Institute of Physics on behalf of the American Vacuum Society. It was established in 1964 and the editor-in-chief is Eray Aydil (University of Minnesota).

== History ==
- 1964–1982 Journal of Vacuum Science and Technology
- 1983–present Journal of Vacuum Science & Technology A: Vacuum, Surfaces, and Films
- 1983–1990 Journal of Vacuum Science & Technology B: Microelectronics Processing and Phenomena
- 1991–present Journal of Vacuum Science & Technology B: Microelectronics and Nanometer Structures

== Part A ==
Part A covers applied surface science, electronic materials and processing, fusion technology, plasma technology, surface science, thin films, vacuum metallurgy, and vacuum technology. According to the Journal Citation Reports, the journal has a 2015 impact factor of 1.724.

== Part B ==
Part B covers vacuum and plasma processing of various materials, their structural characterization, microlithography, and the physics and chemistry of submicrometer and nanometer structures and devices. According to the Journal Citation Reports, the journal has a 2014 impact factor of 1.398.
