= Aurora Public Library =

Aurora Public Library may refer to:

== Canada ==
- Aurora Public Library (Ontario)

== United States ==
- Aurora Public Library (Colorado), library district
- Aurora Public Library (Illinois)
- Aurora Public Library (Indiana)
