= Association of Pension Lawyers =

- Type: Bar association
- Region served: UK

The Association of Pension Lawyers (APL) is a group of more than 1,100 lawyers who practise pension law in the UK. It is a non-profit making organisation and has no connection with the Law Society. Founded in 1984, it represents a forum by which lawyers in different firms and barristers' chambers can exchange knowledge and opinions on pension law and developments. The APL represents an unusually successful example of co-operation between rival lawyers, and the Employment Lawyers Association (ELA) was modelled on it. Its current chair is Claire Carey and its current secretary is Isobel Carruthers.

It has a strong educational element, with an annual conference, frequent seminars and training conferences for more junior pension lawyers. The APL makes technical (but not political) representations on proposed legislative and regulatory changes. It also offers substantial social networking opportunities between pension lawyers, who as a result are more familiar with each other than is customary in other legal disciplines in the UK. Almost all practising pension lawyers subscribe to APL membership, given the practical benefits of membership.
