= Matter and Radiation at Extremes =

Scientific journal

- Discipline: Physics
- Language: English
- Edited by: Weiyan Zhang; Michel Koenig; Ho-Kwang Mao

Publication details
- History: 2016—present
- Publisher: American Institute of Physics; China Academy of Engineering Physics
- Frequency: Bimonthly
- Open access: Yes
- License: CC BY 4.0
- Impact factor: 4.7 (2025)

Standard abbreviations
- ISO 4: Matter Radiat. Extremes

Indexing
- CODEN: MREAE5
- ISSN: 2468-080X

Links
- Journal homepage; Online access; Online archive

Matter and Radiation at Extremes is a peer-reviewed and diamond open access scientific journal published bimonthly by American Institute of Physics on behalf of China Academy of Engineering Physics. Established in 2016, it covers research on experimental and theoretical physics on matter and radiation at extremes, including but not limited to laser plasmas, inertial confinement fusion, radiation hydrodynamics and high pressure physics. Its current editors-in-chief are Weiyan Zhang (China Academy of Engineering Physics), Michel Koenig (CNRS) and Ho-Kwang Mao (Center for High Pressure Science and Technology Advanced Research).

== Abstracting and indexing ==
The journal is abstracted and indexed in:

- Current Contents/Physical, Chemical & Earth Sciences
- Ei Compendex
- Inspec
- Science Citation Index Expanded
- Scopus

According to the Journal Citation Reports, the journal has a 2025 impact factor of 4.7.
