= Journal of Physical and Chemical Reference Data =

- Discipline: Physics
- Language: English
- Edited by: Donald R. Burgess, Jr, Allan H. Harvey

Publication details
- History: 1972-present
- Publisher: American Institute of Physics on behalf of the National Institute of Standards and Technology (United States)
- Frequency: Quarterly
- Impact factor: 3.2 (2024)

Standard abbreviations
- ISO 4: J. Phys. Chem. Ref. Data

Indexing
- CODEN: JPCRBU
- ISSN: 0047-2689 (print); 1529-7845 (web)
- LCCN: 72622555
- OCLC no.: 1754733

Links
- Journal homepage; Online archive

The Journal of Physical and Chemical Reference Data is a quarterly peer-reviewed scientific journal published by AIP Publishing on behalf of the National Institute of Standards and Technology. The objective of the journal is to provide critically evaluated physical and chemical property data, fully documented as to the original sources and the criteria used for evaluation, preferably with uncertainty analysis. The editors-in-chief are Donald R. Burgess, Jr, and Allan H. Harvey.

== Abstracting and indexing ==
The journal is abstracted and indexed in the Science Citation Index Expanded and Current Contents/Physical Chemical and Earth Sciences. According to the Journal Citation Reports, the journal has a 2024 impact factor of 3.2.
