= APL Photonics =

- Discipline: Photonics, material science, optics
- Language: English
- Edited by: Ben Eggleton

Publication details
- History: 2016–present
- Publisher: American Institute of Physics (United States)
- Frequency: Monthly
- Open access: Yes
- Impact factor: 5.7 (2025)

Standard abbreviations
- ISO 4: APL Photonics

Indexing
- CODEN: APPHD2
- ISSN: 2378-0967
- LCCN: 2015201937
- OCLC no.: 969763908

Links
- Journal homepage; Online archive

APL Photonics is a peer-reviewed open access scientific journal published by the American Institute of Physics. The editor-in-chief is Ben Eggleton (The University of Sydney Nano Institute). The journal covers fundamental and applied research on all aspects of photonics.

== Abstracting and indexing ==
The journal is abstracted and indexed in the Science Citation Index Expanded. According to the Journal Citation Reports, the journal has a 2025 impact factor of 5.7.
