= AIP Advances =

- Discipline: Physics
- Language: English
- Edited by: Javier E. Garay, A. T. Charlie Johnson Jr., Ben Slater, Masaaki Tanaka, Enge G. Wang

Publication details
- History: 2011–present
- Publisher: American Institute of Physics (United States)
- Frequency: Continuous
- Open access: Yes
- License: CC BY
- Impact factor: 1.7 (2025)

Standard abbreviations
- ISO 4: AIP Adv.

Indexing
- CODEN: AAIDBI
- ISSN: 2158-3226
- OCLC no.: 780660465

Links
- Journal homepage; Online archive

AIP Advances is an open-access peer-reviewed scientific mega journal published by the American Institute of Physics. It was established in March 2011. It covers all aspects of physics, both experimental and theoretical.

Submissions are peer-reviewed to assess accuracy and originality, while impact, timeliness, and interest are judged a posteriori through online discussion and ranking tools. All articles are published under a Creative Commons License, with the author retaining the copyright and paying a publication fee.

The deputy editors are Javier E. Garay (University of California San Diego), A. T. Charlie Johnson (University of Pennsylvania), Ben Slater (University College London), Masaaki Tanaka (University of Tokyo), and Enge G. Wang (Peking University). The journal is abstracted and indexed by the Science Citation Index Expanded, Scopus, and Current Contents/Physical, Chemical & Earth Sciences.
