= Centre for Ultrahigh Bandwidth Devices for Optical Systems =

The Centre for Ultrahigh bandwidth Devices for Optical Systems (or CUDOS) was a collaboration of Australian and international researchers in optical science and photonics technology. CUDOS is an Australian Research Council Centre of Excellence and was formally launched in 2003.

== Funding history ==
CUDOS commenced operation in 2003 as one of the first Australian Research Council Centres of Excellence, and began with 4 research programs across 7 groups.

It continued through 2007 when ARC renewed funding for another 3 years.

The latest incarnation is based on new ARC funding from 2011 to 2017, with Australian and international researchers collaborating on 6 new Flagship projects.

== Participants ==
CUDOS is a research consortium between 8 groups at 6 Australian Universities: The University of Sydney (CUDOS headquarters), Australian National University, Macquarie University, University of Technology Sydney, RMIT University and Monash University.

The Research Director is Professor Ben Eggleton, with Professor Yuri Kivshar as deputy director and Professor Martijn de Sterke as associate director.

== Aims ==
CUDOS aims to be the world-leader in research in on-chip photonics, for all-optical signal processing. The centre conducts research to create a photonic platform for information transfer and processing technologies. CUDOS aims to translate the intellectual capital, in which researchers aim to build a community of professionals which can drive wealth creation in Australia.

== Research ==
CUDOS brings together Australian and international researchers in optical science and photonics technology, and has demonstrated integrated photonic signal processors designed to increase the information capacity of the Internet.

The centre currently has six Flagship Projects.

Functional Metamaterials and Metadevices: Metamaterials are synthesised on the sub-wavelength scale to have optical properties (refractive index, dispersion) that can differ dramatically from those of bulk materials: perfect lenses, cloaking, and negative refractive index materials are examples. CUDOS aims to develop metamaterials that will enable entirely new ways to control photons.

On-chip Nanoplasmonics: The refractive index of metals is very high, so the wavelength of the optical modes is very short. CUDOS is developing novel techniques to fabricate nano-structured composites of metals and optically transmitting materials. They are investigating novel modes of light propagation in these materials and use them to create ultracompact devices like transmission lines and antennae. The vision of this project is to develop three- and two-dimensional nanoplasmonic structures that can allow unprecedented control of light at the sub wavelength scale.

Hybrid integration: As metamaterials, nanoplasmonic materials and new kinds of nonlinear optical materials are developed, they need to be integrated with existing optical platforms of silicon or chalcogenide, so that light can pass from one material to another on the same 'chip'. This project aims to develop novel designs for integrating such hybrid materials, and novel fabrication techniques.

Mid-Infrared Photonics: The mid-infrared region of the spectrum (3 – 10 μm) has enormous potential for highly efficient sensing of molecules significant in agriculture, natural resource management, homeland security, and others. CUDOS developed photonic platforms and novel sources for this region.

Nonlinear Quantum Photonics: This research focuses on highly compact approaches based on nonlinear optics to generate single photons. The aim is to achieve this on a chip and create a fully integrated flexible platform to generate these single photons and use them to perform quantum-based processing operations.

Terabit per second Photonics: All-optical processing has the potential to replace electronics in many areas of ultrahigh bandwidth communications systems. CUDOS is developing all-optical processors, using nonlinear optics, and investigating new approaches to enable much higher volumes of data to be carried per unit of optical bandwidth.

CUDOS research has been working towards optical circuitry which could result in much faster speeds for data transmission.
