= Break/fix =

Business method in IT service provision

The term break/fix or break'n fix refers to the fee-for-service method of providing information technology (IT) services to businesses. Using this method an IT solution provider performs services as needed and bills the customer only for the work done. The service may include repairs, upgrades or installation of systems, components, peripheral equipment, networking or software.

The alternative to break/fix is managed services, which is a service plan, where the customer pays a fixed amount for services covered in the plan and pays additional amounts for repairs or other work which is not covered in the plan.

The equivalent practice in the consumer market is that of out-of-warranty appliances, where the customer can pay for repairs as needed (break/fix) or they can buy an extended warranty (managed services).

An advantage of break/fix IT management is the initial lower cost of maintenance. However, since problems are only addressed when they arise, maintenance is reactive rather than proactive. Small problems left unaddressed can balloon into major failures due to focus on cost. Unscrupulous providers are incentivized to use inefficient or malicious means to increase break/fix work and thus increase their revenue.
