= Review of Scientific Instruments =

- Discipline: Physics, chemistry
- Language: English
- Edited by: Réjean Boivin

Publication details
- History: 1930-present
- Publisher: American Institute of Physics (United States)
- Frequency: Monthly
- Impact factor: 1.6 (2025)

Standard abbreviations
- ISO 4: Rev. Sci. Instrum.

Indexing
- CODEN: RSINAK
- ISSN: 0034-6748 (print); 1089-7623 (web)
- LCCN: sn99009452
- OCLC no.: 243417110

Links
- Journal homepage; Online archive

Review of Scientific Instruments is a monthly peer-reviewed scientific journal published by the American Institute of Physics. Its area of interest is scientific instruments, apparatus, and techniques. According to the Journal Citation Reports, the journal has a 2025 impact factor of 1.6.

== Editors ==
- 2024–present: Réjean Boivin
- 2024: Robert Kaita (Interim Editor in Chief)
- 2016–2023: Richard C. Pardo
- 2000–2015: Albert T. Macrander
- 1979–1999: Thomas H. Braid
- 1954–1978: J. B. Horner Kuper
- 1940–1954: Gaylord P. Harnwell
- 1940: Joseph A. Becker
- 1932–1939: F. K. Richtmyer
- 1930–1932: Paul D. Foote
