= AAPL =

AAPL may refer to:

- Apple Inc. (NASDAQ ticker symbol AAPL)
- Afro-American Patrolmen's League
- American Association for Physician Leadership
- American Association of Professional Landmen
- American Academy of Psychiatry and the Law
