= APL Materials =

- Discipline: Materials science
- Language: English
- Edited by: Bo Wang

Publication details
- History: 2013-present
- Publisher: American Institute of Physics (United States)
- Impact factor: 4.5 (2025)

Standard abbreviations
- ISO 4: APL Mater.

Indexing
- CODEN: AMPADS
- ISSN: 2166-532X (print); 2166-532X (web)

Links
- Journal homepage

APL Materials is a peer-reviewed open access scientific journal published by the American Institute of Physics. The editor-in-chief is Bo Wang (Beijing Institute of Technology). It covers bioinspired materials, magnetic materials, photovoltaics, tissue engineering, and various other topics. According to the Journal Citation Reports, the journal has a 2025 impact factor of 4.5.

== Abstracting and indexing ==
The journal is abstracted and indexed in the Science Citation Index Expanded, Current Contents/Physical Chemical and Earth Sciences, and Current Contents/Engineering Computing and Technology.
