= Biomicrofluidics =

- Discipline: Microfluidics
- Language: English
- Edited by: Leslie Y. Yeo

Publication details
- History: 2007-present
- Publisher: American Institute of Physics (United States)
- Frequency: Bimonthly
- Impact factor: 3.2 (2022)

Standard abbreviations
- ISO 4: Biomicrofluidics

Indexing
- CODEN: BIOMGB
- ISSN: 1932-1058
- LCCN: 2006214668
- OCLC no.: 69667388

Links
- Journal homepage; Online archive

Biomicrofluidics is a bimonthly peer-reviewed scientific journal covering all aspects of research on fundamental physicochemical mechanisms associated with microfluidic, nanofluidic, and molecular/cellular biophysical phenomena in addition to novel microfluidic and nanofluidic techniques for diagnostic, medical, biological, pharmaceutical, environmental, and chemical applications. The editors-in-chief are Hsueh-Chia Chang (University of Notre Dame) and Leslie Y. Yeo (RMIT University).

== Abstracting and indexing ==
The journal is abstracted and indexed in the Science Citation Index, Current Contents/Physical Chemical and Earth Sciences, and BIOSIS Previews. According to the Journal Citation Reports, the journal has a 2021 impact factor of 3.258.
