= Journal of Applied Physics =

- Discipline: Physics
- Language: English
- Edited by: Julia R. Greer

Publication details
- Former name: Physics
- History: 1931-present
- Publisher: American Institute of Physics (United States)
- Frequency: Weekly
- Impact factor: 2.7 (2025)

Standard abbreviations
- ISO 4: J. Appl. Phys.

Indexing
- CODEN: JAPIAU
- ISSN: 0021-8979 (print); 1089-7550 (web)
- LCCN: 33023425
- OCLC no.: 900973293

Links
- Journal homepage

The Journal of Applied Physics is a peer-reviewed scientific journal with a focus on the physics of modern technology. The journal was originally established in 1931 under the name of Physics, and was published by the American Physical Society for its first 7 volumes. In January 1937, ownership was transferred to the American Institute of Physics "in line with the efforts of the American Physical Society to enhance the standing of physics as a profession". The journal's current editor-in-chief is Julia R. Greer of the California Institute of Technology. The journal is part of AIP Publishing's Subscribe to Open pilot program.

According to the Journal Citation Reports, the journal has a 2025 impact factor of 2.7.
