= American Institute of Physics =

American non-profit organization

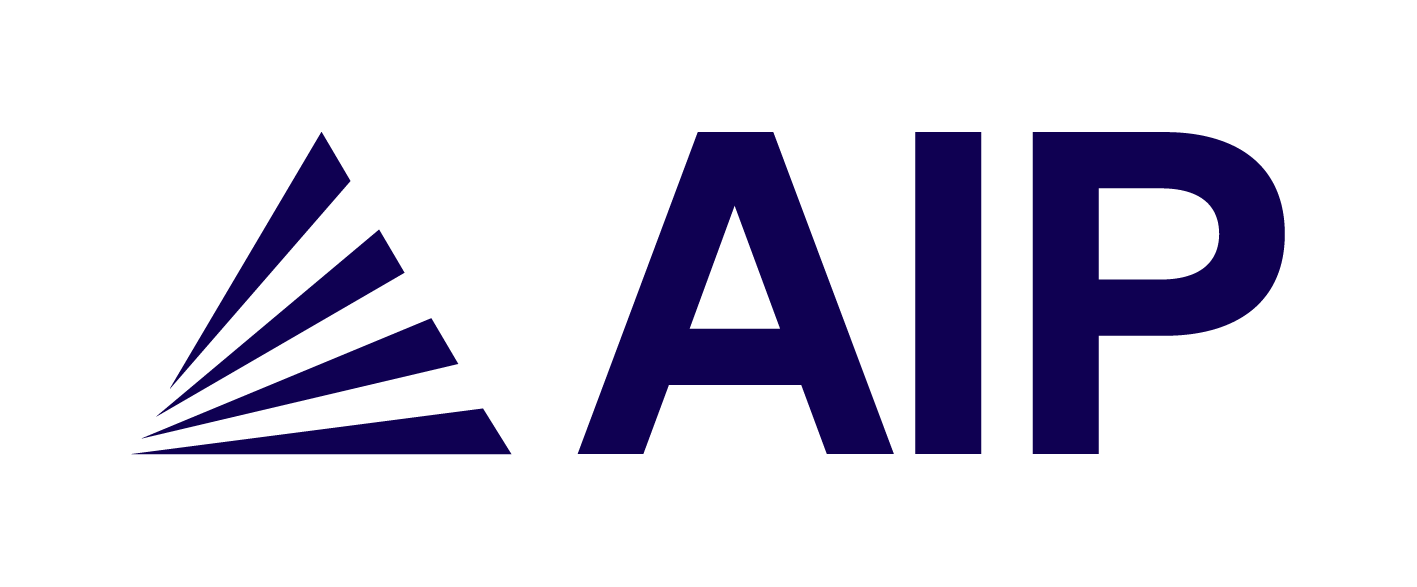
- Abbreviation: AIP
- Formation: 1931
- Type: 501(c)(3) not-for-profit membership corporation
- Headquarters: American Center for Physics (ACP)
- Location: College Park, Maryland
- Members: 120,000 scientists, engineers, educators, and students
- CEO: Michael H. Moloney
- Budget: 75 million USD
- Website: www.aip.org

The American Institute of Physics (AIP) promotes science and the profession of physics, publishes physics journals, and produces publications for scientific and engineering societies. The AIP is made up of various member societies. Its corporate headquarters are at the American Center for Physics in College Park, Maryland, but the institute also has offices in Melville, New York, and Beijing.

== Historical overview ==
The AIP was founded in 1931 as a response to lack of funding for the sciences during the Great Depression. The AIP was founded in 1931 at a joint meeting between four physics societies: the American Physical Society, the Optical Society of America, the Acoustical Society of America, and the Society of Rheology. These were soon joined by the American Association of Physics Teachers, for a total of five societies. It formally incorporated in 1932 consisting of five original "member societies", and a total of four thousand members. As soon as the AIP was established it began publishing scientific journals. By 1943, the AIP published eight journals: Physical Review, Reviews of Modern Physics, Journal of the Optical Society of America, Journal of the Acoustical Society of America, American Journal of Physics, Review of Scientific Instruments, Journal of Applied Physics, and Journal of Chemical Physics.

A new set of member societies was added beginning in the mid-1960s.

The organization restructured in 2013, creating a new subsidiary, AIP Publishing LLC, to manage physical publications of its journals with a smaller board.

== Member societies ==
- Acoustical Society of America
- American Association of Physicists in Medicine
- American Association of Physics Teachers
- American Astronomical Society
- American Crystallographic Association
- American Meteorological Society
- American Physical Society
- American Vacuum Society
- Optica
- Society of Rheology

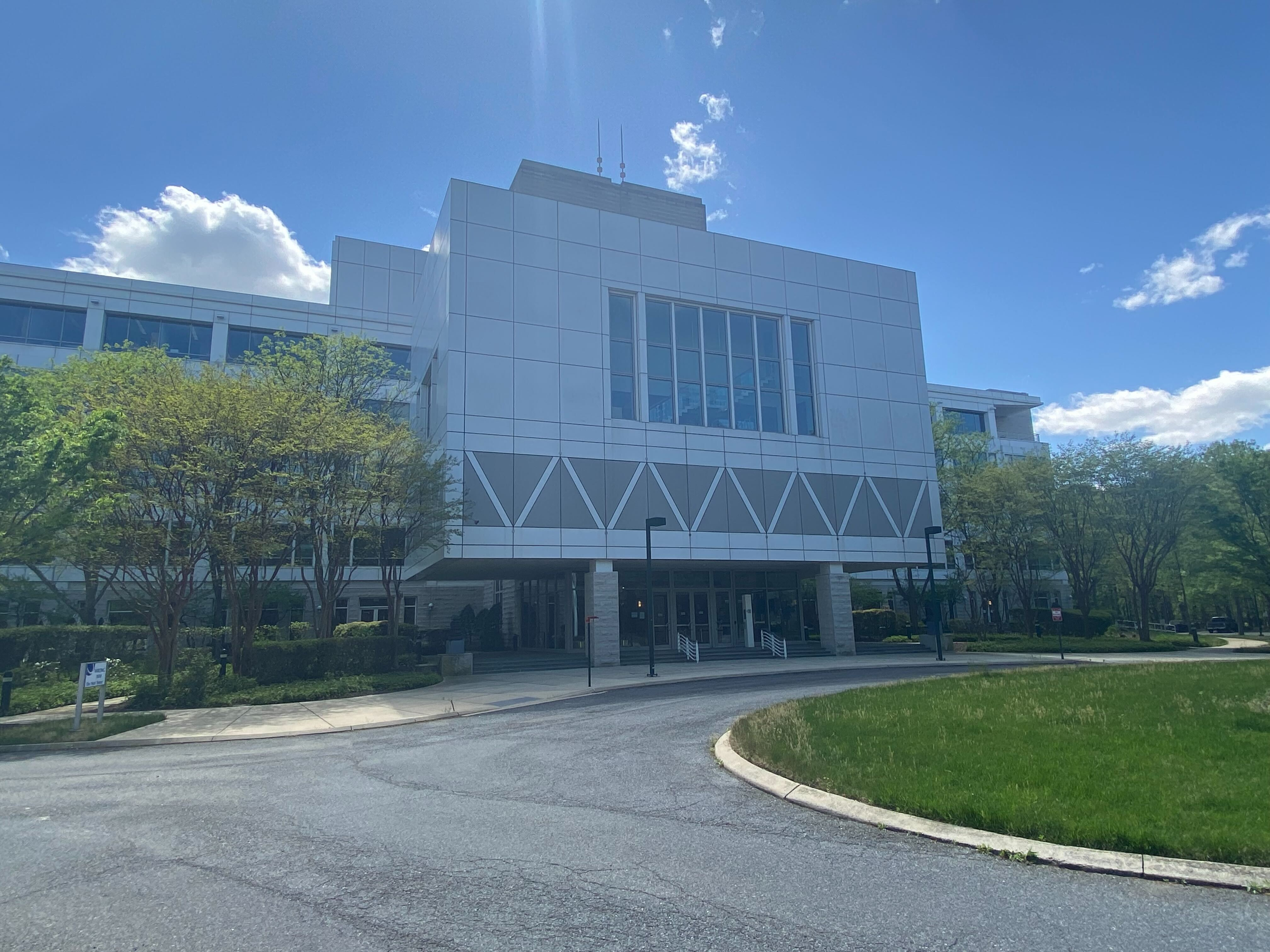
The American Center for Physics, in College Park, Maryland

== Affiliated societies ==
- American Association for the Advancement of Science, Section on Physics
- American Chemical Society, Division of Physical Chemistry
- American Institute of Aeronautics and Astronautics
- American Nuclear Society
- American Society of Civil Engineers
- ASM International
- Astronomical Society of the Pacific
- Biomedical Engineering Society
- Council on Undergraduate Research, Physics & Astronomy Division
- Electrochemical Society
- Geological Society of America
- IEEE Nuclear and Plasma Sciences Society
- International Association of Mathematical Physics
- International Union of Crystallography
- International Centre for Diffraction Data
- Health Physics Society
- Laser Institute of America
- Materials Research Society
- Microscopy Society of America
- National Society of Black Physicists
- Open Access Scholarly Publishers Association
- Polymer Processing Society
- Society for Applied Spectroscopy
- Society of Physics Students
- SPIE

== List of publications ==
The AIP has a subsidiary called AIP Publishing (wholly owned non-profit) dedicated to scholarly publishing by the AIP and its member societies, as well on behalf of other partners.

- AIP Advances
- AIP Conference Proceedings
- APL Bioengineering
- APL Materials
- APL Photonics
- Applied Physics Letters
- Applied Physics Reviews
- Biomicrofluidics
- Biophysics Reviews
- Chemical Physics Reviews
- History of Physics Newsletter
- Journal of Applied Physics
- The Journal of Chemical Physics
- Journal of Mathematical Physics
- Journal of Renewable and Sustainable Energy
- Journal of Physical and Chemical Reference Data
- Journal of Vacuum Science and Technology
- Chaos
- Low Temperature Physics
- Physics of Fluids
- Physics of Plasmas
- Physics Today
- Review of Scientific Instruments
- Scilight

== AIP style ==
AIP created a manual of style first introduced in 1951, called AIP style, which also includes the AIP citation format. It is the most commonly used style and citation format in physics publications.

== Awards and prizes bestowed by the AIP ==
- Andrew Gemant Award – "Recognizes significant contributions to the cultural, artistic, or humanistic dimension of physics"
- John T. Tate Medal for International Leadership in Physics – "Presented for distinguished service to the profession of physics by a non-U.S. national." The award is given biennially on odd-numbered years, and was first given in 1960.
- Karl T. Compton Medal for Leadership in Physics – "Presented for distinguished statesmanship in science." The award is given biennially on even-numbered years, and was established in 1957.
- Dannie Heineman Astrophysics Prize – "Recognizes accomplishments in theoretical astrophysics." Established in 1978, awarded jointly by the AIP and the American Astronomical Society, and funded by the Heineman Foundation.
- Dannie Heineman Prize for Mathematical Physics – "Recognizes accomplishments in mathematical physics." Established in 1959, awarded jointly by the AIP and the American Physical Society, and funded by the Heineman Foundation.
- Abraham Pais Award for History of Physics – "Recognizes outstanding scholarly achievements in the history of physics." Established in 2005, awarded jointly by the AIP and the American Physical Society.
- Meggers Project Award – "Awarded biennially for projects designed to improve high school physics"
- Prize for Industrial Applications of Physics – "Sponsored by General Motors and awarded biennially to publicize the value of physics research in industry"
- Fluid Dynamics Prize – "Recognizes outstanding achievement in research with demonstrated major impact on the discipline, jointly sponsored with the American Physical Society's Division of Fluid Dynamics"
- Science Communication Awards – "Awarded for excellence in Science Communication in Physics and Astronomy for the general public in four categories: Science Writing: Books; Science Writing: Articles; Writing for Children; and Broadcast and New Media"

== See also ==
- Institute of Physics (UK)
- Physics and Astronomy Classification Scheme (PACS)
- Joan Warnow-Blewett
