= Icosahedral twins =

Structure found in atomic clusters and nanoparticles

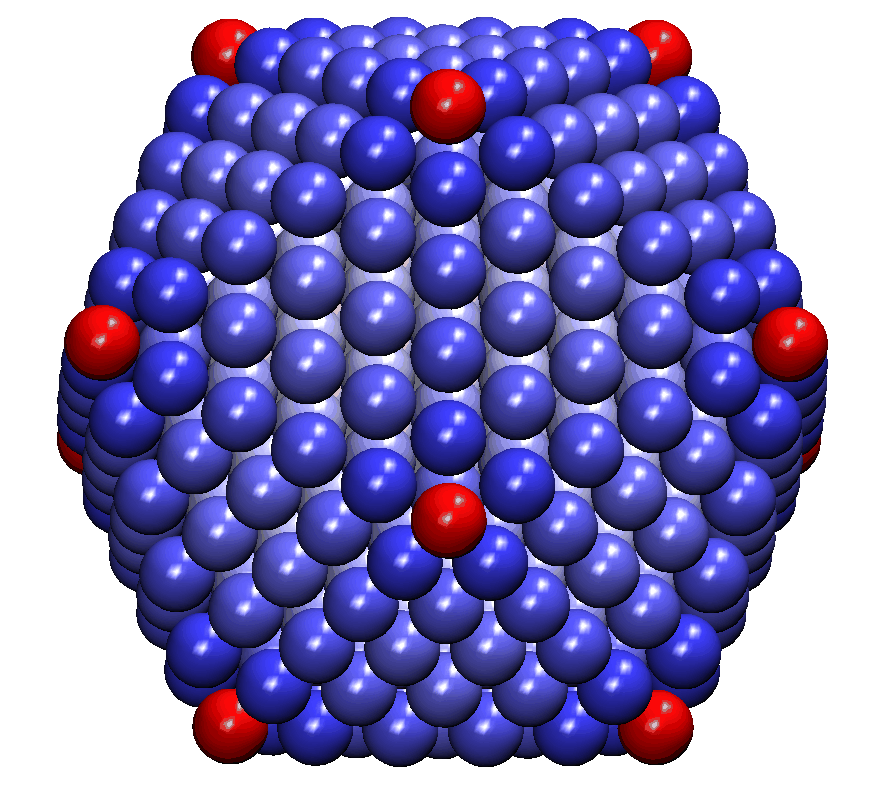
Atomic model of an icosahedral nanoparticle, with red atoms at the five-fold axes

An icosahedral twin is an atomic structure found in atomic clusters and also nanoparticles with some thousands of atoms. Their atomic structure is slightly different from what is found for bulk materials, and contains five-fold symmetries. They have been analyzed in many areas of science including crystal growth, crystallography, chemical physics, surface science and materials science, and are sometimes considered as beautiful due to their high symmetry.

The simplest form of these clusters is twenty interlinked tetrahedral crystals joined along triangular (e.g. cubic-(111)) faces, although more complex variants of the outer surface also occur. A related structure has five units similarly arranged with twinning, which were known as "fivelings" in the 19th century, and more recently as "decahedral multiply twinned particles", "pentagonal particles" or "star particles". A variety of different methods (e.g. condensing metal nanoparticles in argon, deposition on a substrate, wet chemical synthesis) lead to the icosahedral form, and they also occur in virus capsids.

These forms occur at small sizes where they have lower total surface energy than other configurations. This is balanced by an elastic deformation (strain) energy, which dominates at larger sizes. This leads to a competition between different forms as a function of size, and often there is a population of different shapes.

== Shape and energetics ==
In a large particle the energy is dominated by the bulk bonding. The energy of the external surface where the atoms have less bonding is less important. The overall shape is the one which minimizes the total surface energy, the solution of which is the Wulff construction. When the size is reduced a significant fraction of the atoms are at the surface, and hence the total surface energy starts to become comparable to the bulk bonding energy. Icosahedral arrangements, typically because of their smaller total surface energy, can be preferred for small nanoparticles. For face centered cubic (fcc) materials such as gold or silver these structures can be considered as being built from twenty different single crystal units all with three twin facets arranged in icosahedral symmetry, and mainly the low energy {111} external facets. An fcc single crystal has both {111} and {100} surface facets, and perhaps {110} if the energy of the latter is low enough. In contrast icosahedral twins normally have {111} and perhaps {110}, none of the higher energy {100}.

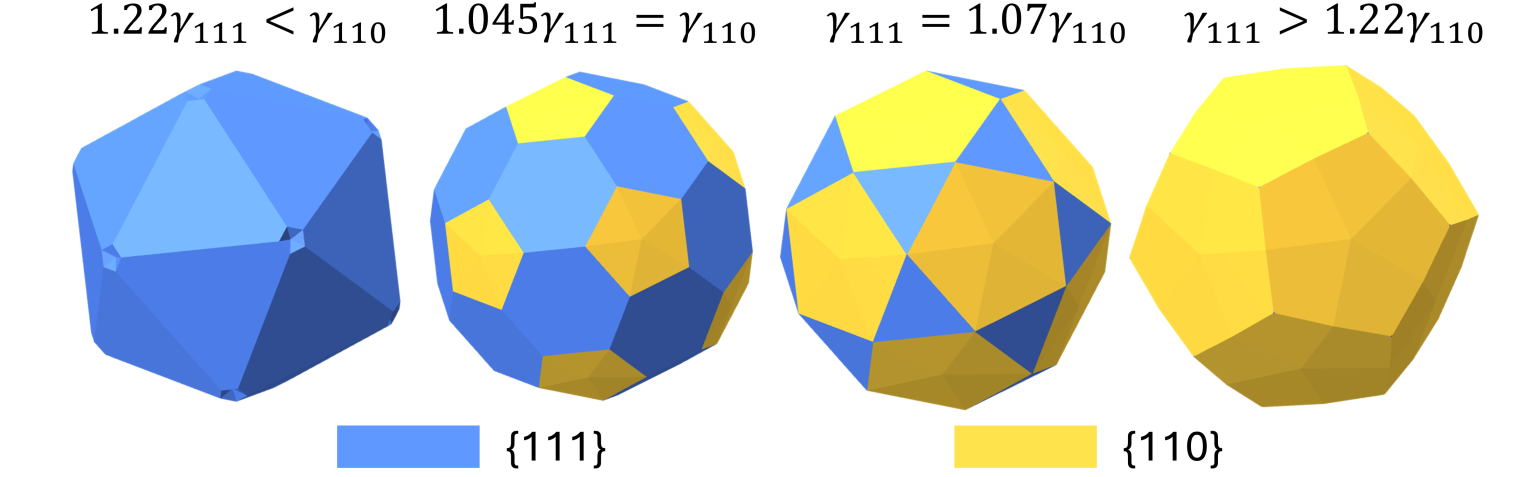
Shapes for different surface energies as indicated and described in the text

The external surface shape for given values of the surface energy can be generated from a modified Wulff construction, and is not always that of a simple icosahedron; there can be additional facets leading to a more spherical shape as illustrated in the figure. Depending upon the relative energies of {111} and {110} facets, the shape can range from an icosahedron (on the left of the figure) with small dents at the five-fold axes (due to the twin boundary energy) when {111} is significantly lower in energy, to (going to the right in the figure) a truncated icosahedron or an icosidodecahedron when the {111} and {110} are similar, and a regular dodecahedron when {110} is significantly lower in energy. The limit where the arrangement of atoms leads to a regular icosahedron is often called a MacKay icosahedron; there can also be a reconstruction of some of the surface atoms to a hexagonal coordination, which is called an anti-MacKay icosahedron. These different shapes have been found in experiments where the relative surface energies are changed with surface adsorbates. There are several software codes that can be used to calculate the shape as a function of the energy of different surface facets. Packing rules for various types of icosahedra with multiple components are also known.

Diagram of an icosahedral twin showing the angular gap with tetrahedra

Made out of single crystal fcc units, these structure cannot fill space and there would be gaps as shown in the figure, so there are some distortions of the atomic positions, equivalent to an elastic deformation to close these gaps. These deformations cost energy, and this strain energy competes with the gain in total surface energy. Roland De Wit pointed out that these can be thought of in terms of disclinations, an approach later extended to three dimensions by Elisabeth Yoffe. This leads to a compression in the center of the particles, and an expansion at the surface.

At small sizes the surface energy often dominates over the strain energy, with icosahedral forms often the most stable ones. At larger sizes the energy to distort becomes larger than the gain in surface energy, and a single crystal with a Wulff construction shape is lowest in energy. The size when the icosahedra become less energetically stable is typically 10-30 nanometers in diameter, but it does not always happen that the shape changes and the particles can grow to micron sizes.

The most common approach to understand the formation of these particles, first used by Shozo Ino in 1969, is to look at the energy as a function of size comparing these icosahedral twins, decahedral nanoparticles and single crystals. The total energy for each type of particle can be written as the sum of three terms:
$$E_\text{total} = E_\text{surface} V^{2/3} + E_\text{strain} V + E_\text{surface stress} V^{2/3}$$
for a volume $V$, where $E_\text{surface}$ is the surface energy, $E_\text{strain}$ is the disclination strain energy to close the gap, and $E_\text{surface stress}$ is a coupling term for the effect of the strain on the surface energy via the surface stress, which can be a significant contribution. The sum of these three terms is compared to the total surface energy of a single crystal (which has no strain), and to similar terms for a decahedral particle. Of the three the icosahedral particles have both the lowest total surface energy and the largest strain energy for a given volume. Hence the icosahedral particles are more stable at very small sizes, the decahedral at intermediate sizes then single crystals. At large sizes the strain energy can become very large, so it is energetically favorable to have dislocations and/or a grain boundary instead of a distributed strain.

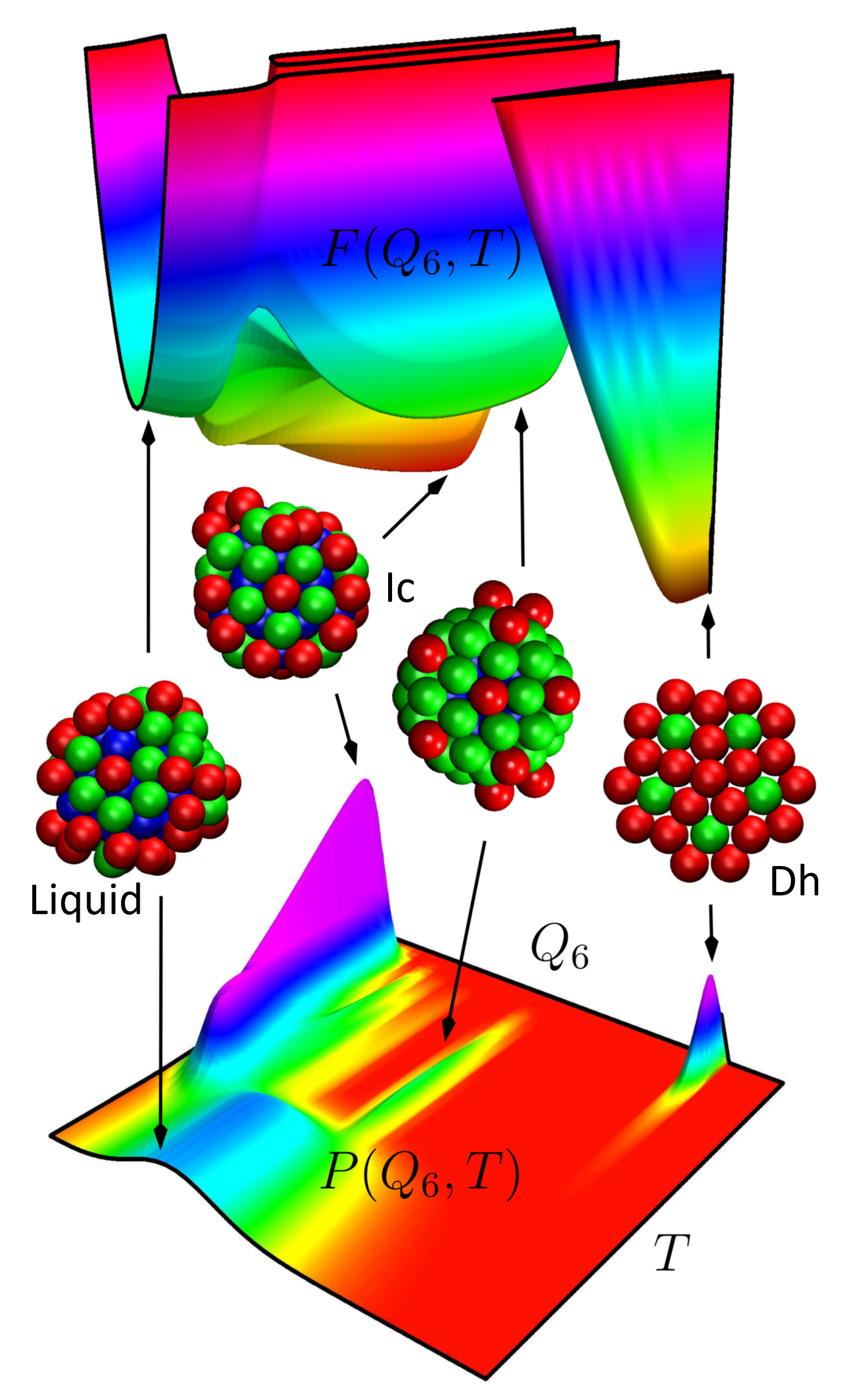
Energy landscape for a 75-atom Leonard-Jones cluster for temperature and an order parameter

There is no general consensus on the exact sizes when there is a transition in which type of particle is lowest in energy, as these vary with material and also the environment such as the gas environment and temperature; the coupling surface stress term and also the surface energies of the facets can both change significantly. In addition, as first described by Michael Hoare and P Pal and R. Stephen Berry and analyzed for these particles by Pulickel Ajayan and Laurence Marks as well as discussed by others such as Amanda Barnard, David J. Wales, Kristen Fichthorn and Francesca Baletto and Riccardo Ferrando, at very small sizes there will be a statistical population of different structures so many different ones will exist at the same time. In many cases nanoparticles are believed to grow from a very small seed without changing shape, and hence what is found reflects the distribution of coexisting structures.

For systems where icosahedral and decahedral morphologies are both relatively low in energy, the competition between these structures has implications for structure prediction and for the global thermodynamic and kinetic properties. These result from a double funnel energy landscape where the two families of structures are separated by a relatively high energy barrier at the temperature where they are in thermodynamic equilibrium. This arises for a cluster of 75 atoms with the Lennard-Jones potential, where the global potential energy minimum is decahedral, and structures based upon incomplete Mackay icosahedra are also low in potential energy, but higher in entropy. The free energy barrier between these families is large compared to the available thermal energy at the temperature where they are in equilibrium. An example is shown in the figure, with probability in the lower part and energy above with axes of an order parameter $Q_6$ and temperature $T$. At low temperature the 75 atom decahedral cluster (Dh) is the global free energy minimum, but as the temperature increases the higher entropy of the competing structures based on incomplete icosahedra (Ic) causes the finite system analogue of a first-order phase transition; at even higher temperatures a liquid-like state is favored.

== Ubiquity ==
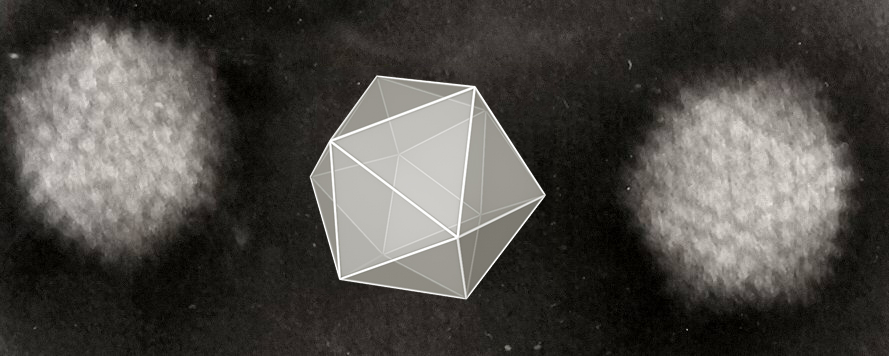
Electron micrograph of two icosahedral adenoviruses, with an illustration to show the shape

Most modern analysis of these shapes in nanoparticles started with the observation of icosahedral and decahedral particles by Shozo Ino and Shiro Ogawa in 1966-67, and independently but slightly later (which they acknowledged) in work by John Allpress and John Veysey Sanders. In both cases these were for vacuum deposition of metal onto substrates in very clean (ultra-high vacuum) conditions, where nanoparticle islands of size 10-50 nm were formed during thin film growth. Using transmission electron microscopy and diffraction these authors demonstrated the presence of the single crystal units in the particles, and also the twin relationships. They called the five-fold and icosahedral crystals multiply twinned particles (MTPs). In the early work near perfect icosahedron shapes were formed, so they were called icosahedral MTPs, the names connecting to the icosahedral ($I_h$) point group symmetry. These forms occur for both elemental nanoparticles as well as alloys and colloidal crystals. Experiments have also demonstrated their existence for unsupported particles produced by inert-gas aggregation in a molecular beam. A related form also exists in icosahedral viruses as shown in the electron micrograph images. While most reports of icosahedral nanoparticles are for sizes of some tens of nanometers, they have been reported for boron carbide with sizes in the micron range.

Quasicrystals are un-twinned structures with long range rotational but not translational periodicity, that some (particularly Linus Pauling) initially tried to explain as due to twinning similar to what is in icosahedral particles. There are also icosahedral-like minerals such as in pyrite where they are called pyritohedra. These form large crystals, but they do not have twinning and the lengths of the sides are not all the same.

== See also ==
- Chemical physics – Subdiscipline of chemistry and physics
- Cluster (chemistry) – Collection of bound atoms or molecules
- Cluster (physics) – Small collection of atoms or molecules
- Crystal habit – Visible shape of a mineral
- Crystal twinning – Phenomenon in crystallization
- Extended Wulff constructions – Shapes for crystals with interfaces and twins
- Disclination – Angular defect in a material
- Fiveling – Five crystals arranged around a common axis
- Icosahedron – Polyhedron with 20 faces
- Nanocluster – Collection of bound atoms or molecules
- Nanomaterials – Materials with granular size 1 to 100 nm
- Nanomaterial based catalyst – Nanoparticle catalysts
- Nanowire – Wire with a diameter in the nanometres
- Nucleation – Initial step in the phase transition or molecular self-assembly of a substance
- Quasi crystals – Ordered chemical structure with no repeating pattern
- Self-assembly of nanoparticles – Physical phenomenon
- Surface energy – Excess energy at the surface of a material relative to its interior
- Surface stress – Change of surface energy with strain
- Wulff construction – Lowest energy shape of a single crystal
