= Fiveling =

Five crystals arranged around a common axis

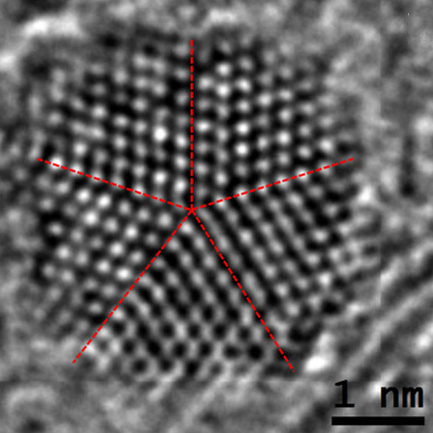
Decahedral PtFe1.2 nanoparticle.

A fiveling, also known as a decahedral nanoparticle, a multiply-twinned particle (MTP), a pentagonal nanoparticle, a pentatwin, or a five-fold twin is a type of twinned crystal that can exist at sizes ranging from nanometers to millimetres. It contains five different single crystals arranged around a common axis. In most cases each unit has a face centered cubic (fcc) arrangement of the atoms, although they are also known for other types of crystal structure.

They nucleate at quite small sizes in the nanometer range, but can be grown much larger. They have been found in mineral crystals (Note: In mineralogy millimeter sized objects are normally referred to as crystals. In other areas the terms are different. When a fiveling has only a very few atoms, for instance the smallest which is seven, it would be called a cluster. They are also sometimes called nucleii or seeds. In the size range 2-100 nm they are currently called nanoparticles, although earlier names are small particles and fine particles.) excavated from mines such as pentagonite or native gold from Ukraine, in rods of metals grown via electrochemical processes and in nanoparticles produced by the condensation of metals either onto substrates or in inert gases. They have been investigated for their potential uses in areas such as improving the efficiency of solar cell or heterogeneous catalysis for more efficient production of chemicals. Information about them is distributed across a diverse range of scientific disciplines, mainly chemistry, materials science, mineralogy, nanomaterials and physics. Because many different names have been used, sometimes the information in the different disciplines or within any one discipline is fragmented and overlapping.

At small sizes in the nanometer range, up to millimetres in size, with fcc metals they often have a combination of {111} and {100} facets, a low energy shape called a Marks decahedron. Relative to a single crystal, at small sizes a fiveling can be a lower energy structure due to having more low energy surface facets. (Note: In the nanoparticle literature as well as physics and chemistry the term facet is common for flat external surfaces, which is how it is used herein. In the mineralogical literature the term facet is more commonly used for the external surfaces created on the surfaces of gemstones by cutting and polishing, and surface faces is used for native crystallographic surfaces such as {111}, which are also sometimes called natural facets.) Balancing this there is an energy cost due to elastic strains to close an angular gap (disclination), which makes them higher in energy at larger sizes. They can be the most stable structure in some intermediate sizes, but they can be one among many in a population of different structures due to a combination of coexisting nanoparticles and kinetic growth factors. The temperature, gas environment and chemisorption can play an important role in both their thermodynamic stability and growth. While they are often symmetric, they can also be asymmetric with the disclination not in the center of the particle.

== History ==
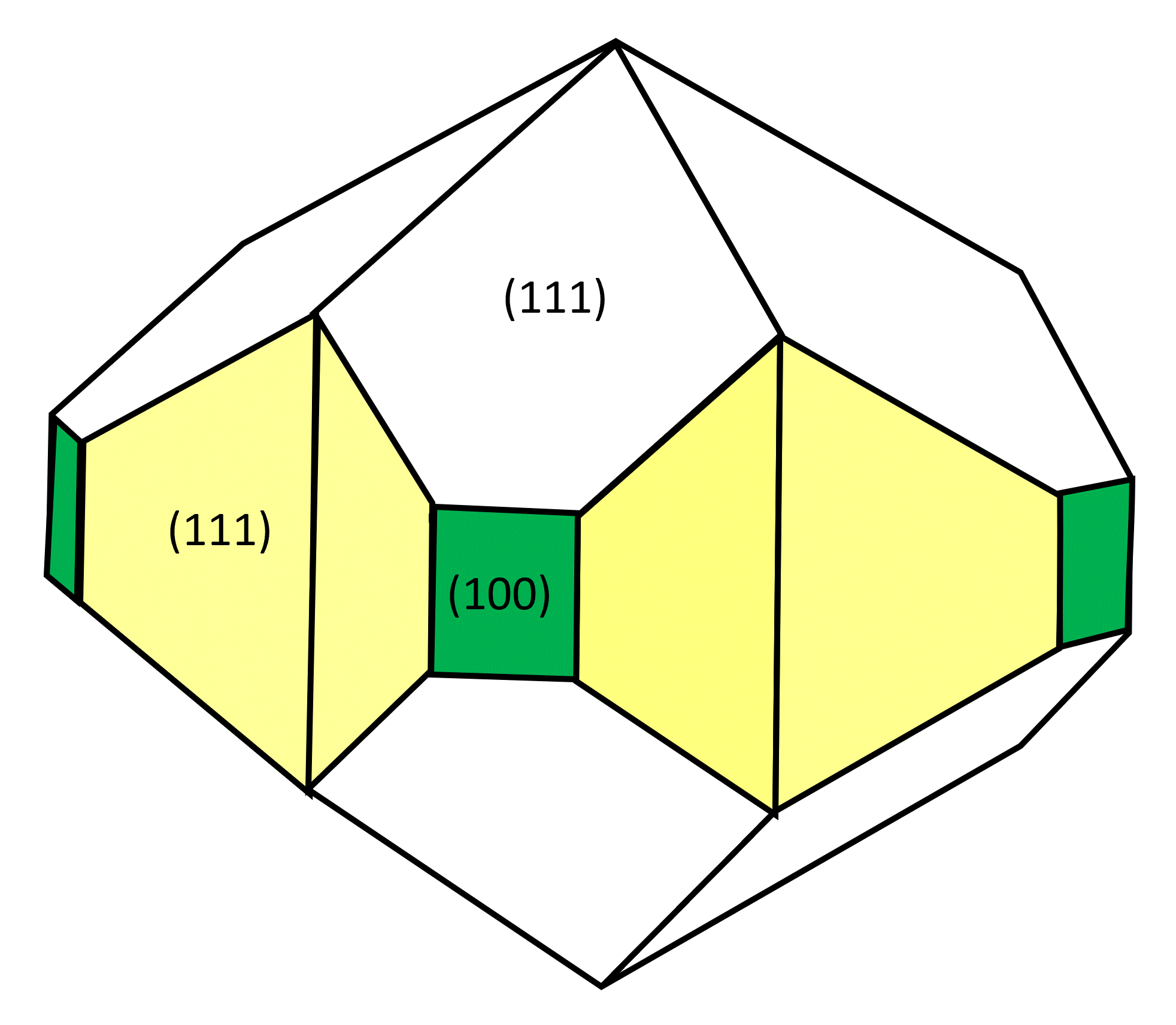
Redrawn version of 1831 sketch of a gold fiveling by Rose, which is a Marks Decahedron with $\gamma_{111} \approx 0.7\gamma_{100}$.

Dating back to the nineteenth century there are reports of these particles by authors such as Jacques-Louis Bournon in 1813 for marcasite, and Gustav Rose in 1831 for gold. In mineralogy and the crystal twinning literature they are referred to as a type of cyclic twin where a number of identical single crystal units are arranged in a ring-like pattern where they all join at a common point or line. The name fiveling comes from them having five members (single crystals). Fivelings have also been described as a type of macle twinning. The older literature was mainly observational, with information on many materials documented by Victor Mordechai Goldschmidt in his Atlas der Kristallformen. Drawings are available showing their presence in marcasite, gold, silver, copper and diamond. New mineral forms with a fiveling structure continue to be found, for instance pentagonite, whose structure was first decoded in 1973, is named because it is often found with the five-fold twinning.

Most modern analysis started with the observation of these particles by Shozo Ino and Shiro Ogawa in 1966-67, and independently but slightly later (which they acknowledged) in work by John Allpress and John Veysey Sanders. In both cases these were for vacuum deposition of metal onto substrates in very clean (ultra-high vacuum) conditions, where nanoparticle islands of size 10-50 nm were formed during thin film growth. Using transmission electron microscopy and diffraction these authors demonstrated the presence of the five single crystal units in the particles, and also the twin relationships. They also observed single crystals and a related type of icosahedral nanoparticle. They called the five-fold and icosahedral crystals multiply twinned particles (MTPs). In the early work near perfect decahedron (pentagonal bipyramid) and icosahedron shapes were formed, so they were called decahedral MTPs or icosahedral MTPs, the names connecting to the decahedral ($D_{5h}$) and icosahedral ($I_h$) point group symmetries. (Note: Common usage is to connect point group names to the corresponding shapes in two dimensions, such as pentagonal with pentagon, and polyhedra in three dimensions such as decahedral for a decahedron (pentagonal bipyramid) and icosahedral for icosahedron.) Parallel, and apparently independent there was work on larger metal whiskers (nanowires) which sometimes showed a very similar five-fold structure, an occurrence reported in 1877 by Gerhard vom Rath. There was fairly extensive analysis following this, particularly for the nanoparticles, both of their internal structure by some of the first electron microscopes that could image at the atomic scale, and by various continuum or atomic models as cited later.

Following this early work there was a large effort, mainly in Japan, to understand what were then called "fine particles", but would now be called nanoparticles. By heating up different elements so atoms evaporated and were then condensed in an inert argon atmosphere, fine particles of almost all the elemental solids were made and then analyzed using electron microscopes. The decahedral particles were found for all face centered cubic materials and a few others, often together with other shapes.

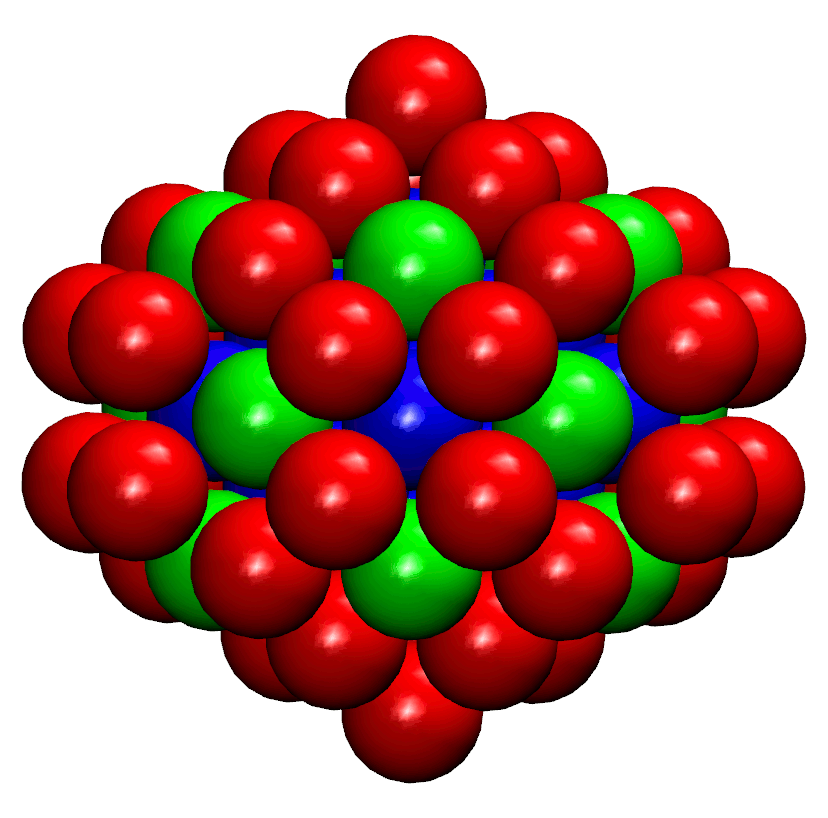
Calculated minimum energy decahedral structure for 75 atoms with a Lennard-Jones potential, an atomistic version of a Marks decahedron.

While there was some continuing work over the following decades, it was with the National Nanotechnology Initiative that substantial interest was reignited. At the same time terms such as pentagonal nanoparticle, pentatwin, or five-fold twin became common in the literature, together with the earlier names. A large number of different methods have now been published for fabricating fivelings, sometimes with a high yield but often as part of a larger population of different shapes. These range from colloidal solution methods to different deposition approaches. It is documented that fivelings occur frequently for diamond, gold and silver, sometimes for copper or palladium and less often for some of the other face-centered cubic (fcc) metals such as nickel. There are also cases such as pentagonite where the crystal structure allows for five-fold twinning with minimal to no elastic strain (see later). There is work where they have been observed in colloidal crystals consisting of ordered arrays of nanoparticles, and single crystals composed on individual decahedral nanoparticles. There has been extensive modeling by many different approaches such as embedded atom, many body, molecular dynamics, tight binding approaches, and density functional theory methods as discussed by Francesca Baletto and Riccardo Ferrando and also discussed for energy landscapes later.

== Disclination strain ==
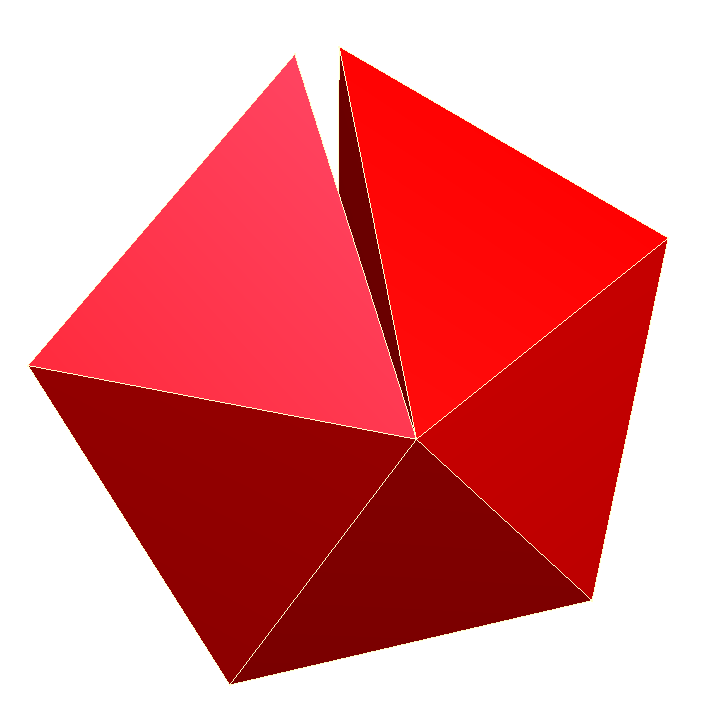
Pentagonal bipyramid showing the angular gap for face-centered cubic.

These particles consist of five different (single crystal) units which are joined together by twin boundaries. The simplest form shown in the figure has five tetrahedral crystals which most commonly have a face centered cubic structure, but there are other possibilities such as diamond cubic and a few others as well as more complex shapes. The angle between two twin planes is approximately 70.5 degrees in fcc, so five of these sums to 352.5 degrees (not 360 degrees) leading to an angular gap. At small sizes this gap is closed by an elastic deformation, which Roland de Wit pointed out could be described as a wedge disclination, a type of defect first discussed by Vito Volterra in 1907. With a disclination the strains to close the gap vary radially and are distributed throughout the particle.

With other structures the angle can be different; marcasite has a twin angle of 74.6 degrees, so instead of closing a missing wedge, one of angle 13 degrees has to be opened, which would be termed a negative disclination of 13 degrees. It has been pointed out by Chao Liang and Yi Yu that when intermetallics are included there is a range of different angles, some similar to fcc where there is a deficiency (positive disclination), others such as AuCu where there is an overlap (negative disclination) similar to marcasite, while pentagonite has probably the smallest overlap at 3.5 degrees.

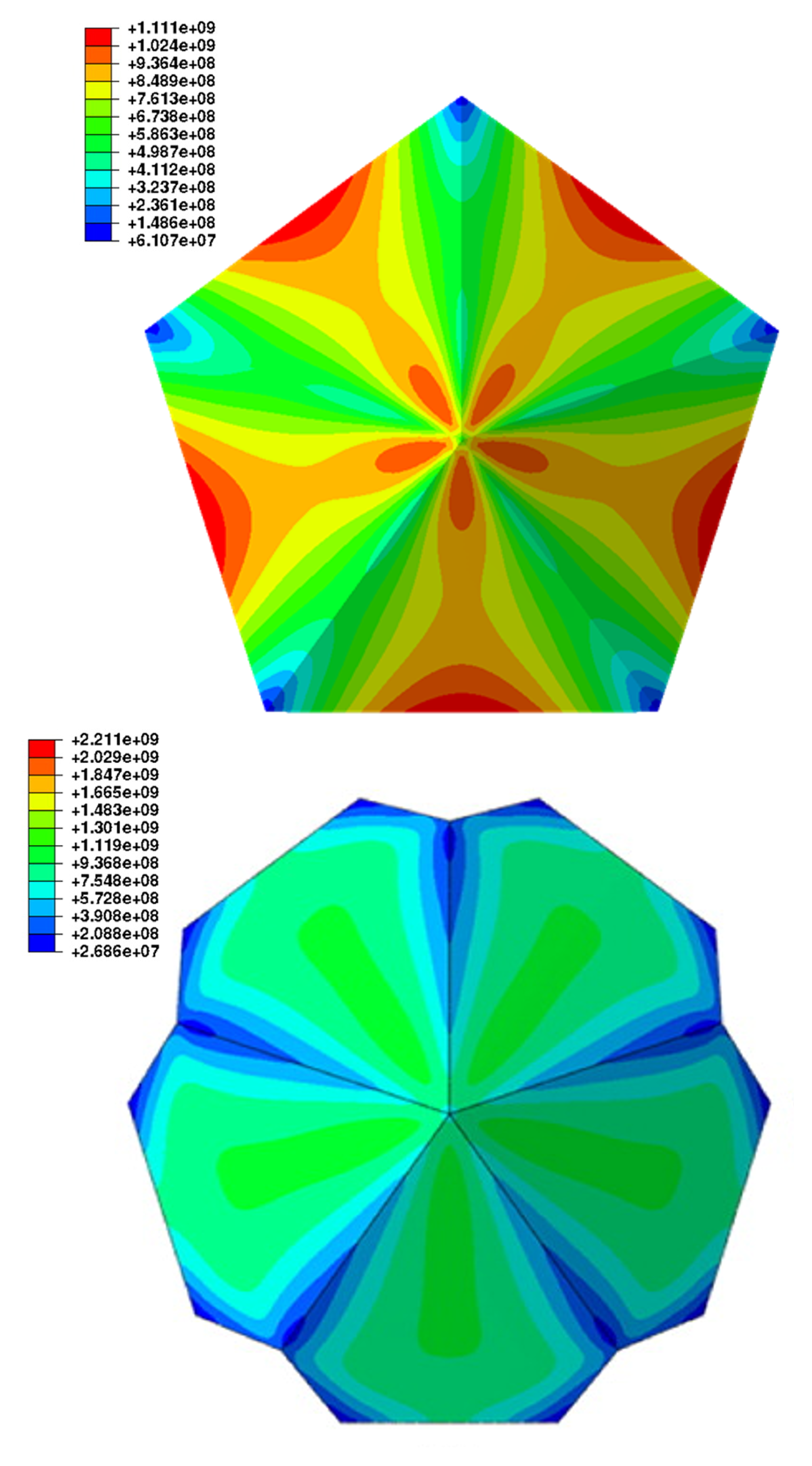
Top view of Von Mises stress in pentagonal bipyramid and Marks decahedron.

Early experimental high-resolution transmission electron microscopy data supported the idea of a distributed disclination strain field in the nanoparticles, as did dark field and other imaging modes in electron microscopes. In larger particles dislocations have been detected to relieve some of the strain. The disclination deformation requires an energy which scales with the particle volume, so dislocations or grain boundaries are lower in energy for large sizes.

More recently there has been detailed analysis of the atomic positions first by Craig Johnson et al, followed up by a number of other authors, providing more information on the strains and showing how they are distributed in the particles. While the classic disclination strain field is a reasonable first approximation model, there are differences when more complete elastic models are used such as finite element methods, particularly as pointed out by Johnson et al, anisotropic elasticity needs to be used. One further complication is that the strain field is three dimensional, and more complex approaches are needed to measure the full details as detailed by Bart Goris et al, who also mention issues with strain from the support film. In addition, as pointed out by Srikanth Patala, Monica Olvera de la Cruz and Marks and shown in the figure, the Von Mises stress are different for (kinetic growth) pentagonal bipyramids versus the minimum energy shape. As of 2024 the strains are consistent with finite element calculations and a disclination strain field, with the possible addition of a shear component at the twin boundaries to accommodate some of the strains.

An alternative to the disclination strain model which was proposed by B. G. Bagley in 1965 for whiskers is that there is a change in the atomic structure away from face-centered cubic; a hypothesis that a tetragonal crystal structure is lower in energy than fcc, and a lower energy atomic structure leads to the decahedral particles. This view was expanded upon by Cary Y. Yang and can also be found in some of the early work of Miguel José Yacamán. There have been measurements of the average structure using X-ray diffraction which it has been argued support this view. However, these x-ray measurements only see the average which necessarily shows a tetragonal arrangement, and there is extensive evidence for inhomogeneous deformations dating back to the early work of Allpress and Sanders, Tsutomu Komoda, Marks and David J. Smith and more recently by high resolution imaging of details of the atomic structure. As mentioned above, as of 2024 experimental imaging supports a disclination model with anisotropic elasticity.

== Three-dimensional shape ==
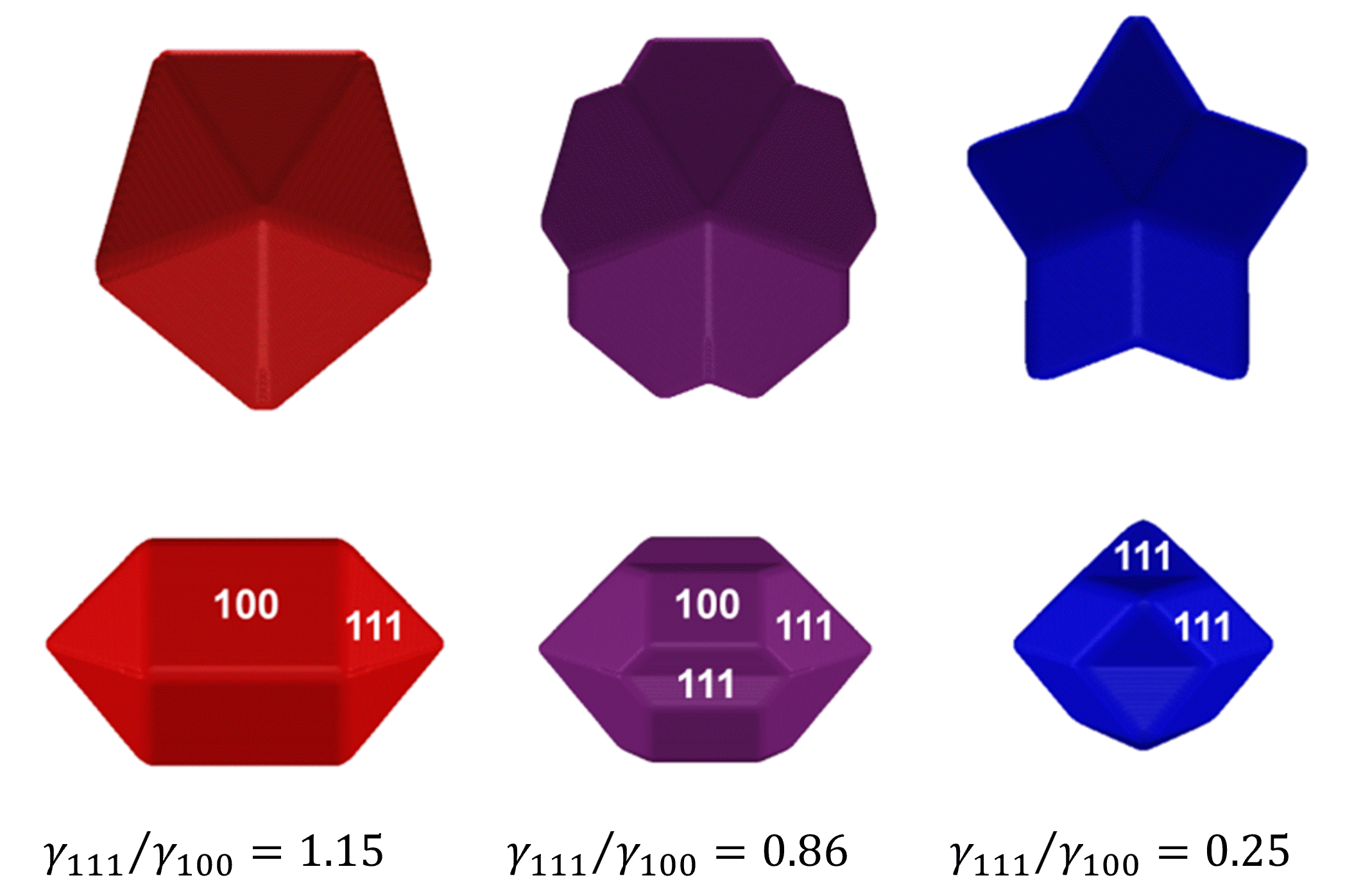
Decahedra for different (100) to (111) surface energies; top, down the common axis, and bottom from the side.

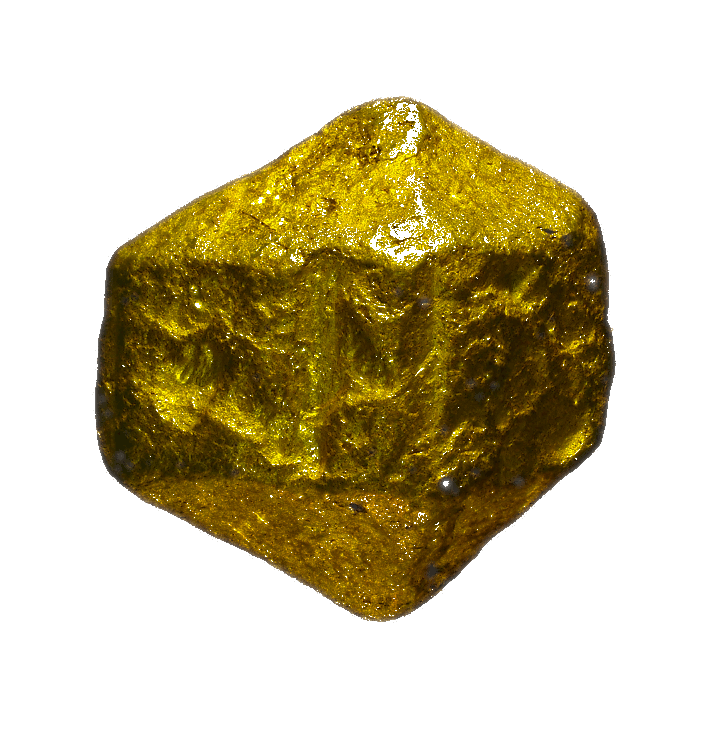
Gold fiveling, 0.5cm tall from Miass, Siberia, Russia, a Marks decahedron with $\gamma_{111} \approx 0.86\gamma_{100}$.

The three-dimensional shape depends upon how the fivelings are formed, including the environment such as gas pressure and temperature. In the very early work only pentagonal bipyramids were reported. In 1970 Ino tried to model the energetics, but found that these bipyramids were higher in energy than single crystals with a Wulff construction shape. He found a lower energy form where he added {100} facets, what is now commonly called the Ino decahedron. The surface energy of this form and a related icosahedral twin scale as the two-thirds power of the volume, so they can be lower in energy than a single crystal as discussed further below.

However, while Ino was able to explain the icosahedral particles, he was not able to explain the decahedral ones. Later Laurence D. Marks proposed a model using both experimental data and a theoretical analysis, which is based upon a modified Wulff construction which includes more surface facets, including Ino's {100} as well as re-entrant {111} surfaces at the twin boundaries with the possibility of others such as {110}, while retaining the decahedral $D_{5h}$ point group symmetry. This approach also includes the effect of gas and other environmental factors via how they change the surface energy of different facets. By combining this model with de Wit's elasticity, Archibald Howie and Marks were able to rationalize the stability of the decahedral to particles. Other work soon confirmed the shape reported by Marks for annealed particles. This was further confirmed in detailed atomistic calculations a few years later by Charles Cleveland and Uzi Landman who coined the term Marks decahedra for these shapes, this name now being widely used.

The minimum energy or thermodynamic shape for these particles depends upon the relative surface energies of different facets, similar to a single crystal Wulff shape; they are formed by combining segments of a conventional Wulff construction with two additional internal facets to represent the twin boundaries. An overview of codes to calculate these shapes was published in 2021 by Christina Boukouvala et al. Considering just {111} and {100} facets:

- The Ino decahedron occurs when the surface energy of the {100} facets is small, $\gamma_{111} > 2 \gamma_{100}/\sqrt{3}$;
- Common is the Marks decahedron with {100} facets and a re-entrant surface at the twin boundaries for $\gamma_{100}/\sqrt{3} < \gamma_{111} < 2\gamma_{100}/\sqrt{3}$
- With $\gamma_{111} < \gamma_{100}/\sqrt{3}$ there is no {100} faceting, and the particles have been called nanostars.
- For very low $\gamma_{100}$ the equilibrium shape is a long rod along the common five-fold axis.

The photograph of an 0.5 cm gold fiveling from Miass is a Marks decahedron with $\gamma_{111} \approx 0.85 \gamma_{100}$, while the sketch of Rose is for $\gamma_{111} \approx 0.7 \gamma_{100}$. The 75 atom cluster shown above corresponds to the same shape for a small number of atoms. Experimentally, in fcc crystals fivelings with only {111} and {100} facets are common, but many other facets can be present in the Wulff construction leading to more rounded shapes, for instance {113} facets for silicon. It is known that the surface can reconstruct to a different atomic arrangement in the outermost atomic plane, for instance a dimer reconstruction for {100} facets of silicon particles of a hexagonal overlayer on the {100} facets of gold decahedra.

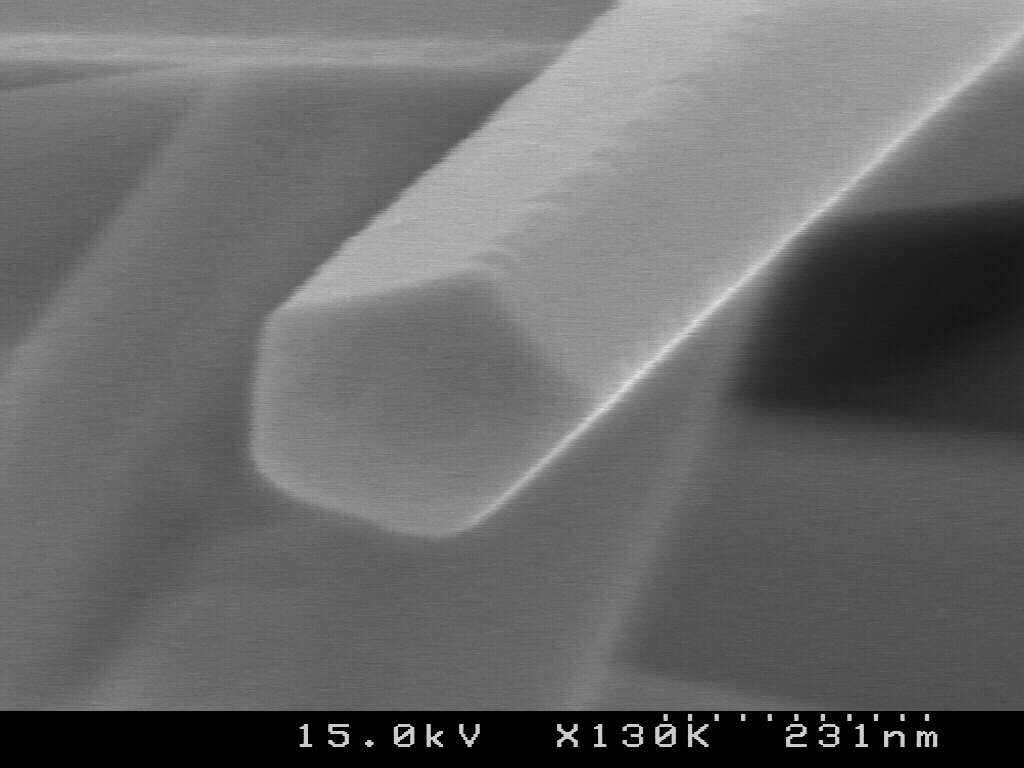
SEM image of decagonal rod of silver.

What shape is present depends not just on the surface energy of the different facets, but also upon how the particles grow. The thermodynamic shape is determined by the Wulff construction, which considers the energy of each possible surface facet and yields the lowest energy shape. The original Marks decahedron was based upon a form of Wulff construction that takes into account the twin boundaries. There is a related kinetic Wulff construction where the growth rate of different surfaces is used instead of the energies. This type of growth matters when the formation of a new island on a flat facet limits the growth rate. If the {100} surfaces of Ino grow faster, then they will not appear in the final shape, similarly for the re-entrant surfaces at the twin boundaries—this leads to the pentagonal bipyramids often observed. Alternatively, if the {111} surfaces grow fast and {100} slow the kinetic shape will be a long rod along the common five-fold axis as shown in the figure.

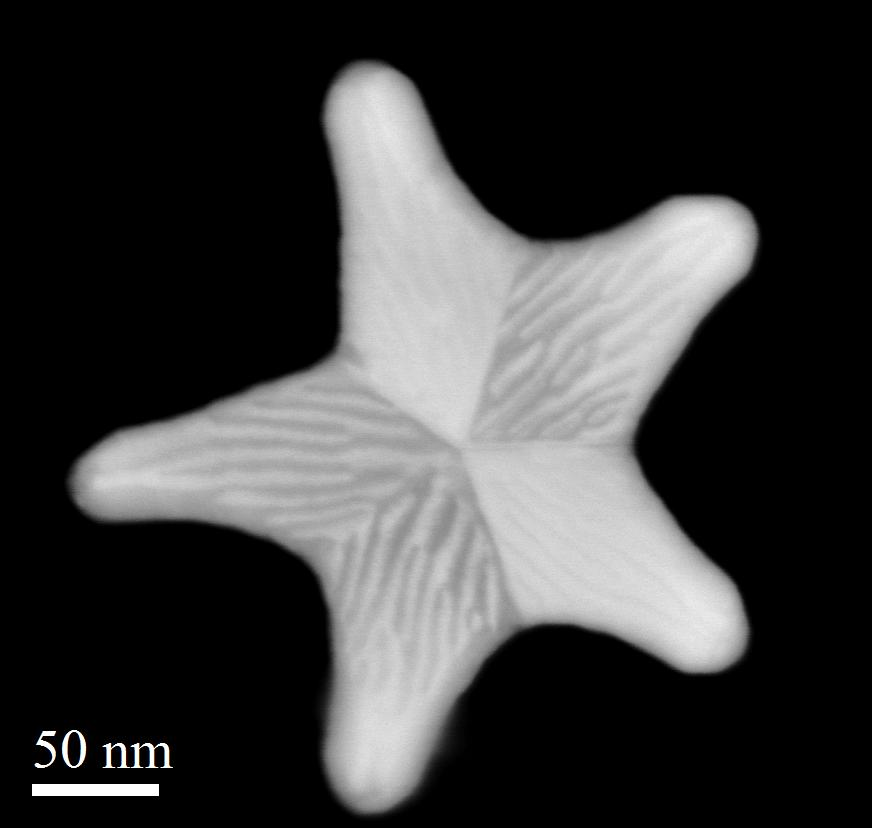
Fiveling (decahedral nanoparticle) showing diffusion growth at tips.

Another different set of shapes can occur when diffusion of atoms to the particles dominates, a growth regime called diffusion controlled growth. In such cases surface curvature can play a major role, for instance leading to spikes originating at the sharp corners of a pentagonal bipyramids, sometimes leading to pointy stars, as shown in the figure.

== Energy versus size ==
The most common approach to understand the formation of these particles, first used by Ino in 1969, is to look at the energy as a function of size comparing icosahedral twins, decahedral nanoparticles and single crystals. The total energy for each type of particle can be written as the sum of three terms:

$$E_{total} = E_{surface} V^{2/3} + E_{strain} V + E_{surface\ stress}V^{2/3}$$

for a volume $V$, where $E_{surface}$ is the surface energy, $E_{strain}$ is the disclination strain energy to close the gap (or overlap for marcasite and others), and $E_{surface \ stress}$ is a coupling term for the effect of the strain on the surface energy via the surface stress, which can be a significant contribution. The sum of these three terms is compared to the total surface energy of a single crystal (which has no strain), and to similar terms for an icosahedral particle. Because the decahedral particles have a lower total surface energy than single crystals due (approximately, in fcc) to more low energy {111} surfaces, they are lower in total energy for an intermediate size regime, with the icosahedral particles more stable at very small sizes. (The icosahedral particle have even more {111} surfaces, but also more strain.) At large sizes the strain energy can become very large, so it is energetically favorable to have dislocations and/or a grain boundary instead of a distributed strain. The very large mineral samples are almost certainly trapped in metastable higher energy configurations.

There is no general consensus on the exact sizes when there is a transition in which type of particle is lowest in energy, as these vary with material and also the environment such as gas and temperature; the coupling surface stress term and also the surface energies of the facets are very sensitive to these. In addition, as first described by Michael Hoare and P. Pal and R. Stephen Berry and analyzed for these particles by Pulickel Ajayan and Marks as well as discussed by others such as Amanda Barnard, David J. Wales, Kristen Fichthorn and Baletto and Ferrando, at very small sizes there will be a statistical population of different structures so many different ones will coexist. In many cases nanoparticles are believed to grow from a very small seed without changing shape, and reflect the distribution of coexisting structures.

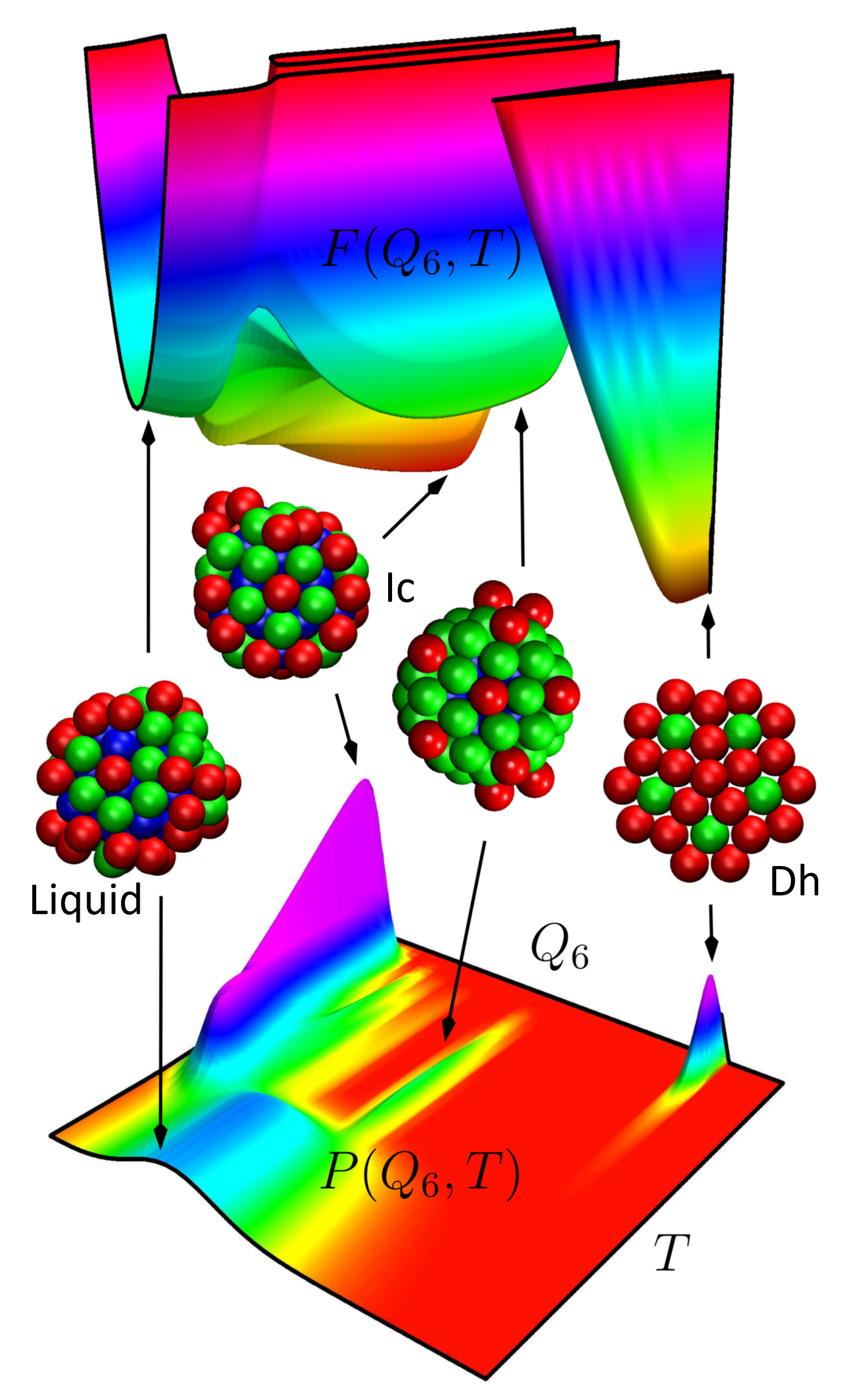
Energy landscape for a 75 atom Leonard-Jones cluster for temperature and an order parameter.

For systems where icosahedral and decahedral morphologies are both relatively low in energy, the competition between these structures has implications for structure prediction and for the global thermodynamic and kinetic properties. These result from a double funnel energy landscape where the two families of structures are separated by a relatively high energy barrier at the temperature where they are in thermodynamic equilibrium. This situation arises for a cluster of 75 atoms with the Lennard-Jones potential, where the global potential energy minimum is decahedral, and structures based upon incomplete Mackay icosahedra are also low in potential energy, but higher in entropy. The free energy barrier between these families is large compared to the available thermal energy at the temperature where they are in equilibrium. An example is shown in the figure, with probability in the lower part and energy above with axes of an order parameter $Q_6$ and temperature $T$. At low temperature the 75 atom decahedral cluster (Dh) is the global free energy minimum, but as the temperature increases the higher entropy of the competing structures based on incomplete icosahedra (Ic) causes the finite system analogue of a first-order phase transition; at even higher temperatures a liquid-like state is favored.

There has been experiment support based upon work where single nanoparticles are imaged using electron microscopes either as they grow or as a function of time. One of the earliest works was that of Yagi et al who directly observed changes in the internal structure with time during growth. More recent work has observed variations in the internal structure in liquid cells, or changes between different forms due to either (or both) heating or the electron beam in an electron microscope including substrate effects.

== Successive twinning ==
Allpress and Sanders proposed an alternative approach to energy minimization to understanding these particles called "successive twinning". Here one starts with a single tetrahedral unit, which then forms a twin either by accident during growth or by collision with another tetrahedron. It was proposed that this could continue to eventually have five units join.

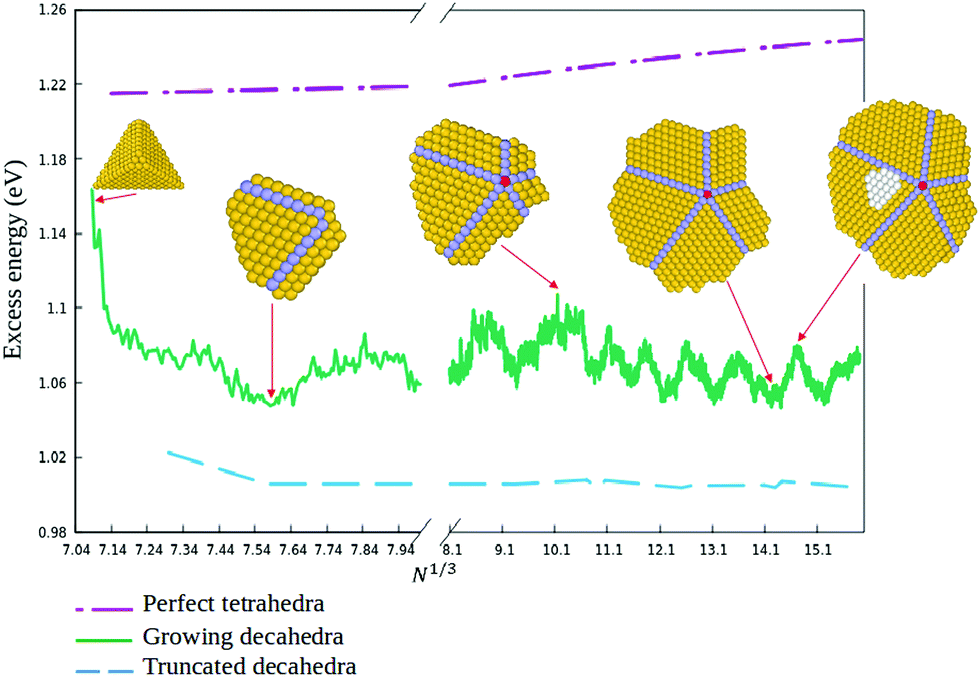
Atomistic simulation of disclination movement in decahedral particles, showing the energies relative to perfect Marks decahedra and tetrahedra.

The term "successive twinning" has now come to mean a related concept: motion of the disclination either to or from a symmetric position as sketched in the atomistic simulation in the figure; see also Haiqiang Zhao et al for very similar experimental images.

While in many cases experimental images show symmetric structures, sometimes they are less so and the five-fold center is quite asymmetric. There are asymmetric cases which can be metastable, and asymmetry can also be a strain relief process or involved in how the particle convert to single crystals or from single crystals. During growth there may be changes, as directly observed by Katsumichi Yagi et al for growth inside an electron microscope, and migration of the disclination from the outside has been observed in liquid-cell studies in electron microscopes. Extensive details about the atomic processes involved in motion of the disclination have been given using molecular dynamics calculations supported by density functional theory as shown in the figure.

== Connections ==
There are a number of related concepts and applications of decahedral particles.

=== Quasicrystals ===
Soon after the discovery of quasicrystals it was suggested by Linus Pauling that five-fold cyclic twins such as these were the source of the electron diffraction data observed by Dan Shechtman. While there are similarities, quasicrystals are now considered to be a class of packing which is different from fivelings and the related icosahedral particles.

=== Heterogeneous catalysts ===
There are possible links to heterogeneous catalysis, with the decahedral particles displaying different performance. The first study by Avery and Sanders did not find them in automobile catalysts. Later work by Marks and Howie found them in silver catalysts, and there have been other reports. It has been suggested that the strain at the surface can change reaction rates, and since there is evidence that surface strain can change the adsorption of molecules and catalysis there is circumstantial support for this. As of 2024, there is some experimental evidence for different catalytic reactivity.

=== Plasmonics ===
It is known that the response of the surface plasmon polaritons in nanoparticles depends upon their shape. As a consequence decahedral particles have specific optical responses. One suggested use is to improve light adsorption using their plasmonic properties by adding them to polymer solar cells.

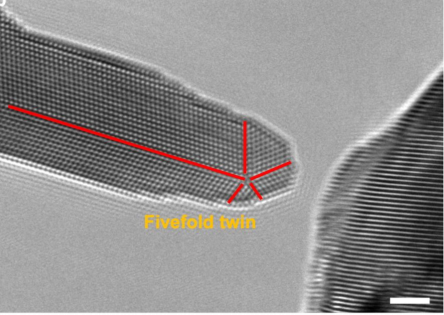
Five-fold twin at an Au tip after tensile failure. The scale bar is 2 nm.

=== Thin films and mechanical deformation ===
Most observations of fivelings have been for isolated particles. Similar structures can occur in thin films when particles merge to form a continuous coating, but do not recrystallize immediately. They can also form during annealing of films, which molecular dynamics simulations have indicated correlates to the motion of twin boundaries and a disclination, similar to the case of isolated nanoparticles described earlier. There is experimental evidence in thin films for interactions between partial dislocations and disclinations, as discussed in 1971 by de Wit. They can also be formed by mechanical deformation. The formation of a local fiveling structure by annealing or deformation has been attributed to a combination of stress relief and twin motion, which is different from the surface energy driven formation of isolated particles described above.

== See also ==
- Chemical physics – Subdiscipline of chemistry and physics
- Cluster (chemistry) – Collection of bound atoms or molecules
- Cluster (physics) – Small collection of atoms or molecules
- Crystal habit – Visible shape of a mineral
- Crystal twinning – Phenomenon in crystallization
- Disclination – Angular defect in a material
- Icosahedral twins – Structure found in atomic clusters and nanoparticles
- Nanocluster – Collection of bound atoms or molecules
- Nanomaterials – Materials with granular size 1 to 100 nm
- Nanowire – Wire with a diameter in the nanometres
- Nucleation – Initial step in the phase transition or molecular self-assembly of a substance
- Surface energy – Excess energy at the surface of a material relative to its interior
- Surface stress – Change of surface energy with strain
- Wulff construction – Lowest energy shape of a single crystal
