= Schroeder's paradox =

Swelling property of certain polymers

Schroeder's paradox refers to the phenomenon of certain polymers exhibiting more solvent uptake (observed as swelling) when exposed to a pure liquid versus a saturated vapor. It is named after the German chemist Paul von Schroeder, who first reported the phenomenon working on a sample of gelatin in contact with water in 1903. An equivalent observation has also been independently discovered and discussed within the biophysical community as the vapor pressure paradox.

The phenomenon was recognized as notable due to its application to the Nafion/water system, with technological importance due to application in proton-exchange membrane fuel cells.

== Theories ==
According to phase equilibrium theory, the activity of a chemical species should be equal to its equilibrium partial vapor pressure, so both saturated vapor and pure liquid should exhibit the same equilibrium for absorption into the polymer. For this reason, Schroeder's experimental results were immediately questioned, and the phenomenon has often been attributed to experimental error, such as failure to attain proper water saturation or isothermal conditions between the phases. However, even exact measurements support an existence of a systematic difference between sorption from saturated vapor and from pure liquid for certain systems.

Additional surface effects along the polymer-liquid interface are required to explain the difference. A mechanism based on action of Maxwell stresses due to formation of an electrical double layer at the polymer's surface, present only where the polymer is submerged in liquid, has been proposed to explain this effect in the case of ion-exchange polymers, and a similar mechanism involving van der Waals and solvation forces for the case of nonionogenic polymers. Mechanistic interpretations based on wetting of micropores in the polymer matrix have also been proposed. The difference in absorption can in either case be explained by a difference in surface stresses on the interface, which differs between immersion in pure liquid and saturated vapor, resolving the paradox without requiring a difference in activity between the two.

== Examples ==
Schroeder's paradox has been reported for various polymer/solvent pairs, such as:

- gelatin/water (Schroeder, 1903)
- phospholipid multilayers/water (Rand & Parsegian, 1989)
- polyvinyl alcohol/water (Heintz & Stephan, 1994)
- polyvinyl alcohol/ethanol (Heintz & Stephan, 1994)
- Nafion/water (Gates, 2000)
- Nafion/methanol (Gates, 2000)
- sulfonated polyethylene/water (Freger, 2000)
- sulfonated polyimide/water (Cornet, 2001)
- polydimethylsiloxane/2-propanol (Valieres, 2005)
- kerogen/propane (Li, 2021)
- kerogen/n-butane (Li, 2021)
- kerogen/n-pentane (Li, 2021)
