= Laurence D. Marks =

American academic (born 1954)

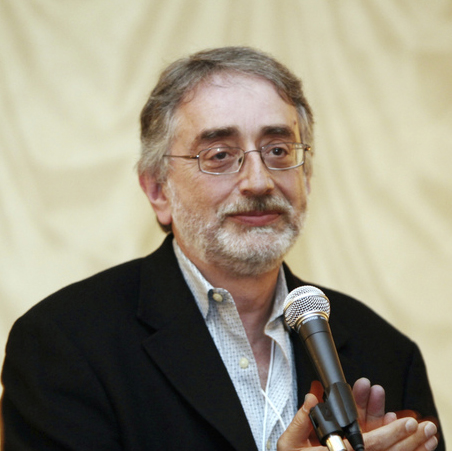
- Marks in 2019
- Born: Laurence Daniel Marks; July 4, 1954 (age 72); Barnet, London, England
- Education: University of Cambridge (BA, PhD)
- Known for: Marks decahedron; Surface science; Electron microscopy
- Awards: ICSOS Surface Structure Prize (2017); Warren Award (2015); Burton Medal (MSA, 1989)
- Scientific career
- Fields: Materials science and engineering
- Workplaces: Northwestern University
- Thesis: The Structure of Small Silver Particles (1980)
- Doctoral students: Pulickel Ajayan (1989); Emilie Ringe (2012)
- Website: www.numis.northwestern.edu

Laurence Daniel Marks (born July 4, 1954) is an American physicist. He is a professor emeritus of materials science and engineering at Northwestern University. He has contributed to the study of nanoparticles and worked in the fields of electron microscopy, diffraction, and crystallography.

== Early life and education ==
Marks attended Trinity School of John Whitgift in Croydon, England. He played chess competitively for the school and won the British Chess Championship Under 21 in 1973.

Marks graduated from King's College, Cambridge, with a B.A. in chemistry in 1976. From 1976 to 1980, he was a research student at the Cavendish Laboratory at Cambridge, where he worked with Archibald Howie on electron microscopy and the structure of metal crystals. He received his Ph.D. in physics from the University of Cambridge in 1980. His dissertation was titled, The Structure of Small Silver Particles.

== Career ==
From 1980 to 1983, Marks was a post-doctoral research assistant at the Cavendish Laboratory. From 1983 to 1985, he was a post-doctoral research assistant with the Department of Physics at Arizona State University in Tempe, Arizona.

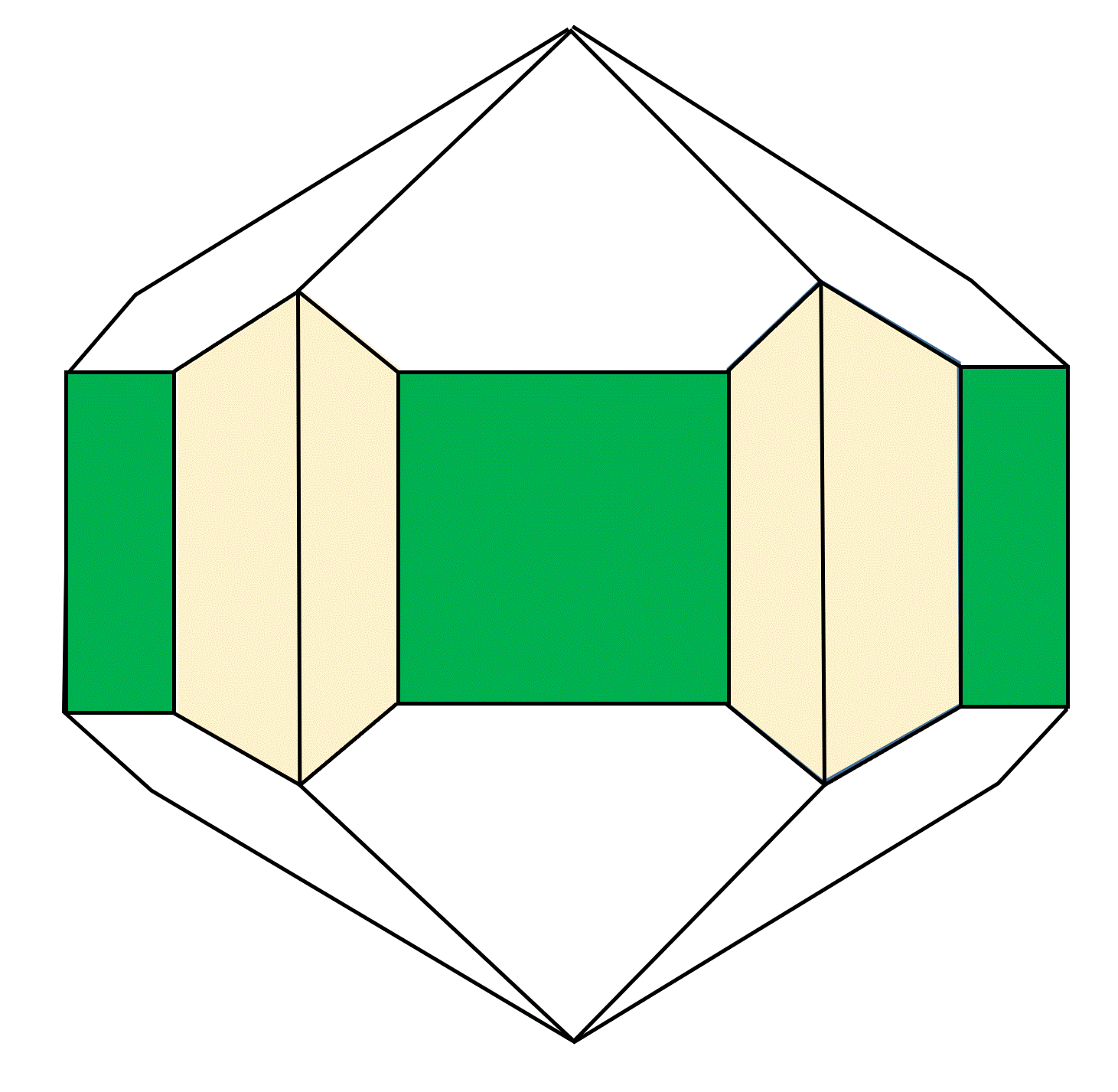
Marks Decahedron

In March 1985, Marks joined the faculty of Northwestern University as an assistant professor in the Department of Materials Science & Engineering. He received a Sloan Research Fellowship for physics in 1987.

Marks was promoted to professor in June 1992. He was chair of the IUCr Commission on Electron Crystallography for two terms from 2005 to 2010. In 2019, he was a senior visiting scientist with the Suzhou Institute of Nano-tech and Nano-bionics (SINANO) of the Chinese Academy of Sciences. In July 2023, Marks was selected for a Fulbright U.S. Scholar Program that allowed him to study triboelecticity in Australia. As of September 2023, Marks is an emeritus professor at Northwestern University.

Starting from his PhD work, he studied nanotwinning, leading toward a way to directly image the atomic scale of nano-surfaces. One of his early research efforts led to the discovery of a type of nanoparticle now known as the Marks decahedron. He has been actively involved in many aspects of electron microscope development, including new methods to solve surface structures as well as using these instruments to discover phenomena such as graphitic materials on hip implants. He also studies how static electricity is generated by rubbing, a phenomenon known as the triboelectric effect.

== Awards and honors ==
In 1989, Marks received the Burton Award from the Microscopy Society of America for achievements in the fields of microscopy and microanalysis by a scientist under 40 years of age. He received the Bertram E. Warren Award from the American Crystallographic Association in 2015 and the International Conference on the Structure of Surfaces Prize in 2017.

Marks was elected as a fellow of the American Physical Society in 2001, for his "contributions to quantitative imaging and diffraction methods for determining the atomic structure of surfaces and bulk materials", and a fellow of the Microscopy Society of America in 2017.

== Selected publications ==
- Marks, L. D.; Howie, A. (November 1979). "Multiply-twinned particles in silver catalysts". Nature. 282 (5735): 196–198. Bibcode:1979Natur.282..196M. doi:10.1038/282196a0. S2CID 4256301.
- Marks, L. D. (September 12, 1983). "Direct Imaging of Carbon-Covered and Clean Gold (110) Surfaces". Physical Review Letters. 51 (11): 1000–1002. Bibcode:1983PhRvL..51.1000M. doi:10.1103/PhysRevLett.51.1000.
- Marks, L. D.; Smith, David J. (May 1983). "Direct surface imaging in small metal particles". Nature. 303 (5915): 316–317. Bibcode:1983Natur.303..316M. doi:10.1038/303316a0. S2CID 4333265.
- Marks, L. D. (July 1984). "Surface structure and energetics of multiply twinned particles". Philosophical Magazine A. 49 (1): 81–93. Bibcode:1984PMagA..49...81M. doi:10.1080/01418618408233431.
- Howie, A.; Marks, L. D. (July 1984). "Elastic strains and the energy balance for multiply twinned particles". Philosophical Magazine A. 49 (1): 95–109. Bibcode:1984PMagA..49...95H. doi:10.1080/01418618408233432.
- Ajayan, P. M.; Marks, L. D. (February 15, 1988). "Quasimelting and phases of small particles". Physical Review Letters. 60 (7): 585–587. Bibcode:1988PhRvL..60..585A. doi:10.1103/PhysRevLett.60.585. PMID 10038590.
- Marks, L D (June 1, 1994). "Experimental studies of small particle structures". Reports on Progress in Physics. 57 (6): 603–649. Bibcode:1994RPPh...57..603M. doi:10.1088/0034-4885/57/6/002. S2CID 250897500.
- Bengu, E.; Marks, L. D. (March 12, 2001). "Single-Walled BN Nanostructures". Physical Review Letters. 86 (11): 2385–2387. Bibcode:2001PhRvL..86.2385B. doi:10.1103/PhysRevLett.86.2385. PMID 11289935.
- Erdman, Natasha; Poeppelmeier, Kenneth R.; Asta, Mark; Warschkow, Oliver; Ellis, Donald E.; Marks, Laurence D. (September 2002). "The structure and chemistry of the TiO2-rich surface of SrTiO3 (001)". Nature. 419 (6902): 55–58. doi:10.1038/nature01010. PMID 12214229. S2CID 4384784.
- Liao, Y.; Pourzal, R.; Wimmer, M. A.; Jacobs, J. J.; Fischer, A.; Marks, L. D. (December 23, 2011). "Graphitic Tribological Layers in Metal-on-Metal Hip Replacements". Science. 334 (6063): 1687–1690. Bibcode:2011Sci...334.1687L. doi:10.1126/science.1213902. PMID 22194573. S2CID 15994675.
- Ding, Kunlun; Gulec, Ahmet; Johnson, Alexis M.; Schweitzer, Neil M.; Stucky, Galen D.; Marks, Laurence D.; Stair, Peter C. (October 9, 2015). "Identification of active sites in CO oxidation and water-gas shift over supported Pt catalysts". Science. 350 (6257): 189–192. Bibcode:2015Sci...350..189D. doi:10.1126/science.aac6368. PMID 26338796. S2CID 13351469.
- Mizzi, C. A.; Lin, A. Y. W.; Marks, L. D. (September 12, 2019). "Does Flexoelectricity Drive Triboelectricity?". Physical Review Letters. 123 (11) 116103. arXiv:1904.10383. Bibcode:2019PhRvL.123k6103M. doi:10.1103/PhysRevLett.123.116103. ISSN 0031-9007. PMID 31573269.
- Blaha, Peter; Schwarz, Karlheinz; Tran, Fabien; Laskowski, Robert; Madsen, Georg K. H.; Marks, Laurence D. (February 21, 2020). "WIEN2k: An APW+lo program for calculating the properties of solids". The Journal of Chemical Physics. 152 (7): 074101. Bibcode:2020JChPh.152g4101B. doi:10.1063/1.5143061. PMID 32087668. S2CID 211260657.
