= Surface stress =

Change of surface energy with strain

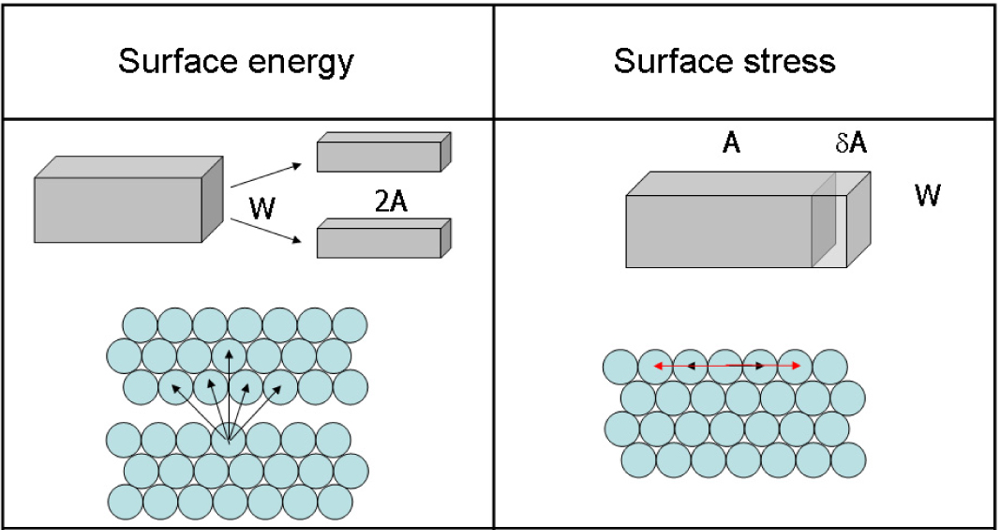
Comparison of surface energy, creating new surface on the left, and surface stress due to elastic deformation

Surface stress was first defined by Josiah Willard Gibbs (1839–1903) as the amount of the reversible work per unit area needed to elastically stretch a pre-existing surface. Depending upon the convention used, the area is either the original, unstretched one which represents a constant number of atoms, or sometimes is the final area; these are atomistic versus continuum definitions. Some care is needed to ensure that the definition used is also consistent with the elastic strain energy, and misinterpretations and disagreements have occurred in the literature.

A similar term called "surface free energy", the excess free energy per unit area needed to create a new surface, is sometimes confused with "surface stress". Although surface stress and surface free energy of liquid–gas or liquid–liquid interface are the same, they are very different in solid–gas or solid–solid interface. Both terms represent an energy per unit area, equivalent to a force per unit length, so are sometimes referred to as "surface tension", which contributes further to the confusion in the literature.

== Thermodynamics of surface stress ==
The continuum definition of surface free energy is the amount of reversible work $dw$ performed to create new area $dA$ of surface, expressed as:

$$dw = \gamma dA$$

In this definition the number of atoms at the surface is proportional to the area. Gibbs was the first to define another surface quantity, different from the surface free energy $\gamma$, that is associated with the reversible work per unit area needed to elastically stretch a pre-existing surface. In a continuum approach one can define a surface stress tensor $f_{ij}$ that relates the work associated with the variation in $\gamma A$, the total excess free energy of the surface due to a strain tensor $e_{ij}$

$$Af_{ij}=d(\gamma A)/de_{ij} = A d\gamma/de_{ij} +\gamma dA/de_{ij}$$

In general there is no change in area for shear, which means that for the second term on the right $i=j$ and $dA/de_{ij}=A\delta_{ij}$, using the Kronecker delta. Cancelling the area then gives

$$f_{ij}=d\gamma /de_{ij}+\delta_{ij} \gamma$$

called the Shuttleworth equation.

An alternative approach is an atomistic one, which defines all quantities in terms of the number of atoms, not continuum measures such as areas. This is related to the ideal of using Gibb's equimolar quantities rather than continuum numbers such as area, that is keeping the number of surface atoms constant. In this case the surface stress is defined as the derivative of the surface energy with strain, that is (deliberately using a different symbol)

$$g_{ij} = d\gamma/de_{ij}$$

This second definition is more convenient in many cases. A conventional liquid cannot sustain strains, so in the continuum definition the surface stress and surface energies are the same, whereas in the atomistic approach the surface stress is zero for a liquid. So long as care is taken the choice of the two does not matter, although this has been a little contentious in the literature.

== Physical origins of surface stress ==
The origin of surface stress is the difference between bonding in the bulk and at a surface. The bulk spacings set the values of the in-plane surface spacings, and consequently the in-plane distance between atoms. However, the atoms at the surface have a different bonding, so would prefer to be at a different spacing, often (but not always) closer together. If they want to be closer, then $d\gamma /de_{ij}$ will be positive—a tensile or expansive strain will increase the surface energy.

For many metals the derivative is positive, but in other cases it is negative, for instance solid argon and some semiconductors. The sign can also strongly depend upon molecules adsorbed on the surface. If these want to be further apart that will introduce a negative component.

== Surface stress values ==
=== Theoretical calculations ===
The most common method to calculate the surface stresses is by calculating the surface free energy and its derivative with respect to elastic strain. Different methods have been used such as first principles, atomistic potential calculations and molecular dynamics simulations, with density functional theory most common. A large tabulation of calculated values for metals has been given by Lee et al. Typical values of the surface energies are 1-2 Joule per metre squared ($Jm^{-2}$), with the trace of the surface stress tensor $g_{ij}$ in the range of -1 to 1 $Jm^{-2}$. Some metals such as aluminum are calculated to have fairly high, positive values (e.g. 0.82) indicating a strong propensity to contract, whereas others such as calcium are quite negative at -1.25, and others are close to zero such as cesium (-0.02).

== Surface stress effects ==
Whenever there is a balance between a bulk elastic energy contribution and a surface energy term, surface stresses can be important. Surface contributions are more important at small sizes, so surface stress effects are often important at the nanoscale.

=== Surface structural reconstruction ===
As mentioned above, often the atoms at a surface would like to be either closer together or further apart. Countering this, the atoms below (substrate) have a fixed in-plane spacing onto which the surface has to register. One way to reduce the total energy is to have extra atoms in the surface, or remove some. This occurs for the gold (111) surface where there is approximately a 5% higher surface density when it has reconstructed. The misregistry with the underlying bulk is accommodated by having partial partial dislocations between the first two layers. The silicon (111) is similar, with a 7x7 reconstruction with both more atoms in the plane and some added atoms (called adatoms) on top.

Different is the case for anatase (001) surfaces. Here the atoms want to be further apart, so one row "pops out" and sits further from the bulk.

=== Adsorbate-induced changes in the surface stress ===
When atoms or molecules are adsorbed on a surface, two phenomena can lead to a change in the surface stress. One is a change in the electron density of the atoms in the surface, which changes the in-plane bonding and thus the surface stress. A second is due to interactions between the adsorbed atoms or molecules themselves, which may want to be further apart (or closer) than is possible with the atomic spacings in the surface. Note that since adsorption often depends strongly upon the environment, for instance gas pressure and temperature, the surface stress tensor will show a similar dependence.

=== Lattice parameter changes in nanoparticles ===
For a spherical particle the surface area will scale as the square of the size, while the volume scales as the cube. Therefore surface contributions to the energy can become important at small sizes in nanoparticles. If the energy of the surface atoms is lower when they are closer, this can be accomplished by shrinking the whole particle. The gain in energy from the surface stress will scale as the area, balanced by an energy cost for the shrinking (deformation) that scales as the volume. Combined these lead to a change in the lattice parameter that scales inversely with size. This has been measured for many materials using either electron diffraction or x-ray diffraction. This phenomenon has sometimes been written as equivalent to the Laplace pressure, also called the capillary pressure, in both cases with a surface tension. This is not correct since these are terms that apply to liquids.

One complication is that the changes in lattice parameter lead to more involved forms for nanoparticles with more complex shapes or when surface segregation can occur.

=== Stabilization of decahedral and icosahedral nanoparticles ===
Also in the area of nanoparticles, surface stress can play a significant role in the stabilization of decahedral nanoparticle and icosahedral twins. In both cases an arrangement of internal twin boundaries leads to lower energy surface energy facets. Balancing this there are nominal angular gaps (disclinations) which are removed by an elastic deformation. While the main energy contributions are the external surface energy and the strain energy, the surface stress couples the two and can have an important role in the overall stability.

=== Deformation and instabilities at surfaces ===
During thin film growth, there can be a balance between surface energy and internal strain, with surface stress a coupling term combining the two. Instead of growing as a continuous thin film, a morphological instability can occur and the film can start to become very uneven, in many cases due to a breakdown of a balance between elastic and surface energies. The surface stress can lead to comparable wrinkling in nanowires, and also a morphological instability in a thin film.

== See also ==
- Gibbs free energy – Type of thermodynamic potential
- Nanowire – Wire with a diameter in the nanometres
- Nanoparticles – Particle with size less than 100 nm
- Surface energy – Excess energy at the surface of a material relative to its interior
- Surface science – Study of physical and chemical phenomena that occur at the interface of two phases
- Surface tension – Tendency of a liquid surface to shrink to reduce surface area
- Thermodynamics – Physics of heat, work, and temperature
