= Kristen Fichthorn =

American chemical engineer and physicist

- Education: University of Pennsylvania; University of Michigan
- Scientific career
- Fields: Chemical engineering physics
- Workplaces: Penn State College of Engineering

Kristen A. Fichthorn is an American chemical engineer and condensed matter physicist

whose research involves computational simulation, multiscale modeling, and molecular dynamics of interfaces, thin films, colloids, catalysis, nanostructures, and other material processes. She is the Merrell Fenske Professor of Chemical Engineering and Professor of Physics at Pennsylvania State University.

== Early life and education ==
Fichthorn has a 1985 bachelor's degree in chemical engineering from the University of Pennsylvania, and completed her Ph.D. in chemical engineering in 1989 at the University of Michigan.

After a year of postdoctoral research at the University of California, Santa Barbara, supported by IBM, Fichthorn joined the Pennsylvania State University faculty as an assistant professor in 1990.

Since 1986, Fichthorn has authored or co-authored 292 articles and papers on interfaces and surfaces.

== Career and research ==
Fichthorn's research focus on applying atomistic simulation techniques, such as Monte Carlo methods and molecular dynamics, quantum mechanics, and condensed-matter theory to study materials interfaces.

Fichthorn's research interest include:

- Computational Materials and Nanomaterials
- Multi-scale materials simulation
- Quantum density functional theory
- Molecular dynamics
- Monte Carlo analysis
- Thin film and crystal growth
- Liquid-solid interfaces

== Publications ==
- Miao Song, Jianming Cui, Colin Ophus, Jaewon Lee, Tianyu Yan, Kristen A Fichthorn and Dongsheng Li, 2024, "Tensile Strain Induces Consecutive Dislocation Slipping, Plane Gliding, and Subsequent De-twinning of Penta-Twinned Nanoparticles", Nano Letters, 24, (4), pp. 1153–1159
- Tianyu Yan, Huaizhong Zhang and Kristen A Fichthorn, 2023, "Minimum Free-Energy Shapes of Ag Nanocrystals: Vacuum vs Solution", ACS Nano, 17, (19), pp. 19288-19304
- Jianming Cui, Saksham Phul and Kristen A Fichthorn, 2023, "Diffusion Growth Mechanism of Penta-Twinned Ag Nanocrystals from Decahedral Seeds", Journal of Chemical Physics, 158, (16), pp. 164707 (10 pages)
- Dongsheng Li, Qian Chen, Jaehun Chun, Kristen A Fichthorn, James De Yoreo and Haimei Zheng, 2023, "Nanoparticle Assembly and Oriented Attachment: Correlating Controlling Factors to the Resulting Structures", Chemical Reviews, 123, (6), pp. 3127-3159

== Awards and recognitions ==
Fichthorn was named as a Fellow of the American Physical Society (APS) in 2010, after a nomination from the APS Division of Condensed Matter Physics, "for simulations that revealed new phenomena in the kinetics of reaction systems, self-assembly of nanostructures, and diffusion in mesoporous systems". She became a Fellow of the American Institute of Chemical Engineers in 2017.

She was the recipient of the 2019 Nanoscale Science and Engineering Forum Award of the American Institute of Chemical Engineers, and one of two 2020 Langmuir Lecturers of the American Chemistry Society Colloid & Surface Division.

She received NSF Presidential Young Investigator Award in 1990 which is recognized by Penn State for her outstanding research and teaching.

=== Further honors ===
- Langmuir Lectureship, Division of Colloid and Surface Science, American Chemical Society, August 2020
- Nanoscale Science and Engineering Forum Award, American Institute of Chemical Engineers, August 2019
- Premier Research Award, Penn State Engineering Alumni Society, October 2017
- Fellow, American Institute of Chemical Engineers, June 2017
