= Pulickel Ajayan =

Indian engineer

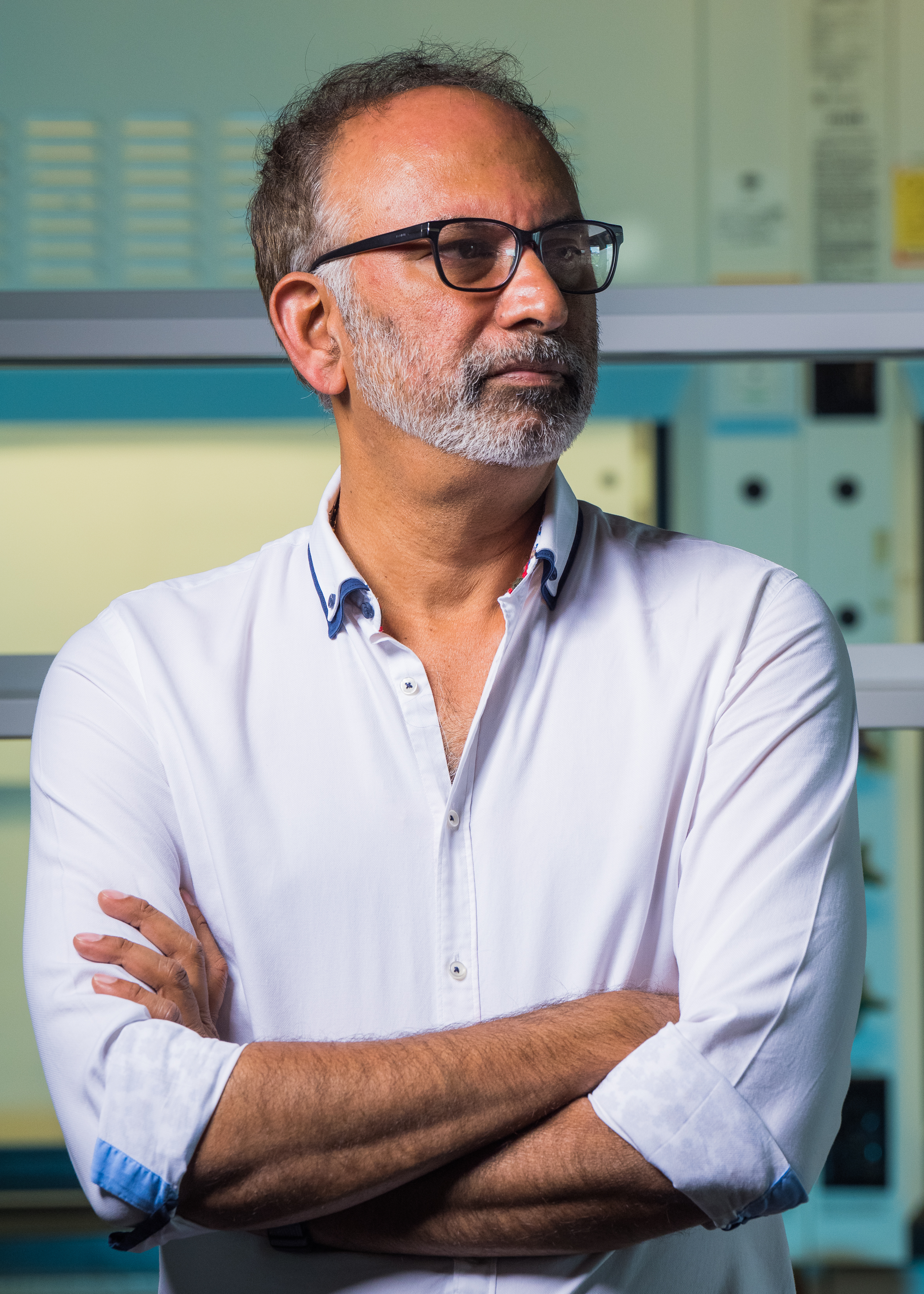
- Ajayan in 2021
- Born: 15 July 1962 (age 64); Thrissur, Kerala, India
- Education: IIT (BHU) Varanasi; Northwestern University
- Known for: Nanotechnology
- Scientific career
- Fields: Materials science and Nanotechnology
- Workplaces: Rice University, Houston
- Thesis: Phase instabilities in small particles (1989)
- Doctoral advisor: Laurence D. Marks

Pulickel Madhavapanicker Ajayan (P. M. Ajayan) is the Benjamin M. and Mary Greenwood Anderson Professor in Engineering at Rice University, Houston, Texas. He is a professor in the Materials Science and NanoEngineering Department and also holds joint appointments with the Department of Chemistry and Department of Chemical and Biomolecular Engineering. Prior to joining Rice, he was the Henry Burlage Professor of Material Sciences and Engineering at Rensselaer Polytechnic Institute, Troy, New York, until 2007. He has contributed significantly to the field of nanotechnology over the past three decades of his academic career and is particularly known for his pioneering work in the early days of the discovery and development of carbon nanotubes.

== Early life and education ==
Ajayan hails from Kodungallur, a coastal town in the Indian state of Kerala. He was born on 15 July 1962 to K. Madhavapanicker, a telephone technician, and Pulickel Radha, a Hindi school teacher at the local high school. He studied in a government school in Kodungallur where the medium of instruction was Malayalam until 6th standard, after which he moved to Loyola School, Thiruvananthapuram, a high school he has credited for making a strong impact on him. After graduating from Loyola in 1977, he completed two years of his pre-degree at Christ college, Irinjalakuda, close to his hometown. In 1985, Ajayan graduated at the top of his class with a BTech degree in Metallurgical Engineering from IIT (BHU) Varanasi. In 1989, he earned a PhD in Materials Science and Engineering from Northwestern University, Evanston, Illinois. After his PhD, he spent three years as a post-doc at NEC Corporation, Japan, two years as a researcher at the Laboratoire de Physique des Solides, Orsay, France, and one year at the Max Planck Institute for Metals Research, Stuttgart, Germany.

== Research ==
Ajayan has been a pioneer in the field of nanotechnology. His PhD work (1989) involved transmission electron microscopy characterization of gold nanoparticles, their phase instabilities and substrate interactions. Afterwards, he was involved in the early development of carbon nanotubes during his post-doctoral work. From 1990 onwards, at the NEC Fundamental Research Laboratory in Tsukuba, Japan, he worked with Sumio Iijima and Thomas Ebbesen and published some of the early works in carbon nanotubes. His works reporting the first observation of the smallest nanotubes with a single layer, large-scale method for synthesizing nanotubes, and filling of nanotube hollows with capillary forces were all early breakthroughs that led to the development of the nanotube field. Later, over the next decade, he published extensively in the nanotube area and was a key figure in the field. In the past three decades, in addition to carbon nanotubes, he has worked on various materials systems, including graphene and two-dimensional (2D) materials, diamond, nanocomposites, catalysts and energy storage materials. He has published more than 1300 journal papers, which have earned more than 230,000 citations on Google Scholar and an h-index of 233 as of March 2025. He has to his credit two Guinness World Records for creating the smallest brush and the darkest material. His team created the darkest known material, a carpet of carbon nanotubes, that reflects only 0.045% of light. Over the years, his team has been responsible for several innovative materials discoveries in the energy storage area that include a flexible paper battery, paintable battery concept, organic battery electrodes, high-temperature batteries and supercapacitors, and environmentally friendly Li-ion battery recycling using deep eutectic solvents. His work has also involved designing new materials for contaminant removal from water, nanotube sponges for selective absorption of oil from oil-water mixture, and catalysts for CO_{2} reduction. His group has published several pioneering works in the vapour phase growth methods for the synthesis of atomically thin 2D materials such as boron nitride, transition metal dichalcogenides and their hybrid constructs. His group has also contributed to 3D printing of complex architected structures from different materials systems. His group is now working on the synthesis of artificial diamonds and other ultra-wide bandgap materials such as boron nitride. His recent interests also include plasma-based technologies and bio-derived materials.

Ajayan's research over the years has focused on the design and creation of nano-engineered materials for many applications that include energy storage, structural, electronics, coatings and catalysis. Apart from leading a large research team, he also focuses on teaching and lecturing around the world on nanotechnology. He is the founding chair of the Department of Materials Science and Nanoengineering at Rice and served as its chair for the first ten years. He serves on the advisory board of several materials and nanotechnology journals, nanotechnology startups and international conferences. In his role as an academic at Rice and RPI, Ajayan has been a major promoter of nanotechnology, teaching various interdisciplinary courses at the undergraduate and graduate levels. Constantly travelling to disseminate knowledge, Ajayan has a large number of collaborators worldwide and several of his past group members presently hold faculty positions abroad and inside the United States. He has had distinguished visiting professor positions at various prestigious Universities around the world, such as several of the IITs, and IISC in India, NTU Singapore, Shinshu University, Japan and ISIS Strasbourg, France. As a Helmoltz-Humboldt prize winner, he was a frequent visitor at the Institute of Nanotechnology in KIT, Karlsruhe, Germany, during 2007–2010. He has been consistently listed among the most cited researchers and top materials scientists in the world.

== Personal life ==
Ajayan is married to Poornima, who also works at Rice University as a program manager, and they have two daughters.

== Honors ==
- Materials Today Innovation Award (2024)
- Elected to the Indian National Science Academy (2024)
- Jawaharlal Nehru Birth Centenary Medal for International Collaboration and Public Understanding of Science and Technology (2019)
- Alumnus of the Century in Making Award IIT-BHU (2019)
- Elected Fellow to the US National Academy of Inventors (NAI) (2019)
- Lifetime Achievement Nanotechnology Award, Houston Technology Center, Houston, TX (2016)
- Elected MRS Fellow (2016)
- Nanosmat Prize (2016) – for outstanding contributions in the field of nanoscience
- Spiers Memorial Award, Royal Society of Chemistry, UK (2014)
- Docteur Honoris Causa Université Catholique de Louvain (2014)
- Distinguished Career Award for Alumni from the Department of Materials Science and Engineering, Northwestern University, Evanston, IL (2013)
- Helmoltz-Humboldt Senior Award (2008)
- Materials Research Society (MRS) medal, 2006
- Holder of two Guinness Book of World Records (2007, 2005)
- Helmoltz-Humboldt Prize (2007)
- Elected Fellow of AAAS (2007)
- Microscopic Society of America Burton Award (1997)
- Hadfield Medal for Outstanding Metallurgist, India (1985)
- Gold Medal - IIT BHU Metallurgical Engineering (1985)
