= Amanda Barnard =

Australian physicist (born 1971)

Amanda Barnard AM
- Born: 31 December 1971 (age 54); Sydney
- Citizenship: Australia
- Education: RMIT University
- Known for: Statistical methods in nanoscience, nanoinformatics
- Awards: Feynman Prize in Nanotechnology
- Scientific career
- Fields: Physics
- Institutions: Australian National University

Amanda Susan Barnard AM (born 31 December 1971) is an Australian theoretical physicist working in predicting the real world behavior of nanoparticles using analytical models and supercomputer simulations and applied machine learning. Barnard is a pioneer in the thermodynamic cartography of nanomaterials, creating nanoscale phase diagrams relevant to different environmental conditions, and relating these to structure/property maps. Her current research involves developing and applying statistical methods and machine/deep learning in nanoscience and nanotechnology, and materials and molecular informatics. In 2014 she became the first person in the southern hemisphere, and the first woman, to win the Feynman Prize in Nanotechnology, which she won for her work on diamond nanoparticles.

Barnard is currently based in Australia as Professor of Computational Science in the Research School of Computer Science at the Australian National University.

== Biography ==
In 2001, she graduated with a first-class honours science degree from the Royal Melbourne Institute of Technology (RMIT), majoring in applied physics. Barnard received a PhD in 2003 from RMIT for her computer modelling work predicting and explaining various forms of nanocarbon at different sizes. Following her PhD, Barnard served as a Distinguished Postdoctoral Fellow in the Center for Nanoscale Materials at Argonne National Laboratory (USA). She also held a senior research position as Violette & Samuel Glasstone Fellow at the University of Oxford (UK) with an Extraordinary Research Fellowship at The Queen's College. Professor Barnard then moved to CSIRO as an ARC Queen Elizabeth II Fellow, an Office of the Chief Executive Science Leader, and finally as a Chief Research Scientist spanning 2009 to 2020.

== Qualifications ==
- 2003 Doctor of Philosophy (Physics), RMIT University
- 2001 Bachelor of Science, First Class Honours (Applied Physics), RMIT University

== Career highlights, awards, fellowships and grants ==
- 2022 Member of the Order of Australia (AM) in the 2022 Australia Day Honours for "significant service to computational science, to medical research, and to education".
- 2019 AMMA Medal, Association of Molecular Modellers of Australasia
- 2017 Woman of Achievement, Black & White Foundation, Australia
- 2014 Feynman Prize in Nanotechnology (Theory)
- 2014 ACS Nano Lectureship (Asia/Pacific), American Chemical Society, USA
- 2010 IEEE Distinguished Lecturer Award, IEEE, South Australia
- 2010 UNSW Eureka Prize for Scientific Research, Australian Museum
- 2010 Frederick White Prize, Australian Academy of Science
- 2009 Malcolm McIntosh Prize for Physical Scientist of the Year
- 2009– Leader of the Virtual Nanoscience Laboratory, CSIRO Materials Science and Engineering
- 2009— Queen Elizabeth II Fellowship, Australian Research Council
- 2009 Mercedes-Benz Australian Environmental Research Award, Banksia Environmental Foundation
- 2009 Young Scientist Prize in Computational Physics, International Union of Pure and Applied Physics
- 2009 JG Russell Award, Australian Academy of Science
- 2009 Future Summit Leadership Award, Australian Davos Connection
- 2008 L'Oréal Australia For Women in Science Fellowship
- 2008 Alumnus of the Year, RMIT University
- 2008 Inaugural Future Generation Fellowship, School of Chemistry, University of Melbourne
- 2005–2008 Extraordinary Junior Research Fellowship, Queen's College, Oxford, UK
- 2005–2008 Violette & Samuel Glasstone Fellowship, Department of Materials, University of Oxford, UK
- 2004 Innovation Award (Student Category), RMIT University
- 2004 University Research Prize, RMIT University
- 2003–2005 Distinguished Postdoctoral Fellowship, Center for Nanoscale Materials, Argonne National Laboratory, USA

== Research highlights ==
- Identified the link between nanomorphology and the environmental stability of nanomaterials, and how it influences reactivity and potential "nano-hazards"
- Developed a new technique for investigating the shape of nanomaterials as a function of size, temperature or chemical potential, able to include experimentally realistic structures and chemical environments
- First researcher to report investigations into the effect of shape on size-dependent phase transitions in nanomaterials
- Discovered the first example of anisotropic (facet-dependent) surface electrostatic potential in a homoelemental nanomaterial, resulting in dipolar or multipolar interactions in a non-polar material
- Leader in statistical nanoscience and the use of statistical analysis and machine learning to predict the properties of diverse and complex ensembles of nanoscale materials.
