= Winterbottom =

Winterbottom is a surname. Notable people with the surname include:

- Archibald Winterbottom (1814–1884), British cotton cloth merchant
- George Harold Winterbottom (1861–1934), business magnate
- Harold Edward Winterbottom (1879–1953), South Australian businessman
- Ian Winterbottom, Baron Winterbottom (1913–1992), British politician
- Kevin Winterbottom (1955–1976), South African Air Force pilot
- Mark Winterbottom (born 1981), racing driver
- Michael Winterbottom (academic) (born 1934), English classical scholar
- Michael Winterbottom (born 1961), British filmmaker
- Oliver Winterbottom, automotive designer
- Peter Winterbottom (born 1960), rugby union footballer
- Richard Winterbottom (1899–1968), British politician
- Thomas Masterman Winterbottom (1766–1859), English physician
- Thomas Winterbottom (Lord Mayor of London, 1751-2)
- Walter Winterbottom (1913–2002), British football manager
- Walter L. Winterbottom (1930-2013), US material scientist noted for the Winterbottom construction

== In music ==
- The Winterbottom family of British military band musicians:
  - John Winterbottom (1795–1855), dynasty founder
    - Thomas Winterbottom (c1815–1869). Royal Marines bandmaster, Plymouth (1851-1869)
    - William Winterbottom (c1820 – 1889). Bandmaster and arranger
    - John Winterbottom (1825–1897). Bassoon player, conductor and bandmaster
    - Henry Winterbottom (dates unknown), bandmaster
    - Ammon Winterbottom (died 1891), double-bass player
      - Frank Winterbottom (1861–1930). Cellist, bandmaster, composer, arranger
      - Charles Henry Winterbottom (1866–1935), double-bass player, founding member of the London Symphony Orchestra

== In fiction ==
- Bonnie Winterbottom, a character on the television series How to Get Away with Murder
- Hartley Winterbottom, a character on the television series Chuck
- P.B. Winterbottom, the title character in the computer game The Misadventures of P.B. Winterbottom

== See also ==
- Murgatroyd and Winterbottom, a British comedy double act
- Winterbottom v Wright (1842), an English legal case responsible for constraining the law's stance on negligence
- Winterbottom construction, shape of a particle on a substrate
- Winterbotham, a surname
