= Single-entity electrochemistry =

Single-Entity Electrochemistry (SEE) refers to the electroanalysis of an individual unit of interest. A unique feature of SEE is that it unifies multiple different branches of electrochemistry. Single-Entity Electrochemistry pushes the bounds of the field as it can measure entities on a scale of 100 microns to angstroms. Single-Entity Electrochemistry is important because it gives the ability to view how a single molecule, or cell, or "thing" affects the bulk response, and thus the chemistry that might have gone unknown otherwise. By resolving stochastic responses at the single-molecule scale, SEE holds promise for revealing complex electron transfer mechanisms, allowing researchers to re-examine classical electrochemical theories and providing theoretical support for the design of molecular devices. The ability to monitor the movement of one electron or ion from one unit to another is valuable, as many vital reactions and mechanisms undergo this process. Electrochemistry is well suited for this measurement due to its incredible sensitivity. Single-Entity Electrochemistry can be used to investigate nanoparticles, wires, vesicles, nanobubbles, nanotubes, cells, and viruses, and other small molecules and ions. Single-entity electrochemistry has been successfully used to determine the size distribution of particles as well as the number of particles present inside a vesicle or other similar structures.

== Early history ==
=== Coulter Counter ===
The Coulter Counter was created by Wallace H. Coulter in 1949. The Coulter counter consists of two electrolyte reservoirs that are connected by a small channel, through which a current of ions flow. Each particle drawn through the channel causes a brief change to the electrical resistance of the liquid. The change in the electrical resistance causes a disturbance in the electric field. The counter detects these changes in electrical resistance; the size of the particles in the field is proportional to magnitude of the disturbance in the electric field.

=== Patch-Clamp Electrophysiology ===
Patch-Clamp Electrophysiology was developed by Neher and Sakmann in 1976. This technique allowed measurements of individual proteins through ion channels. A glass pipette was fixed to the cell membrane, and the ion currents though the ion channels were measured. The Patch-Clamp method increased the sensitivity of detection by three orders of magnitude over previous methods, and the time resolution for the measurements was decreased to nearly 10 microseconds. The success of this method was a result of the ability to create a high resistance seal between the glass micropipette and the cell membrane; isolating the system chemically and electrically.

=== Single-Cell Electrochemistry ===
While it is useful to study bulk cell entities, there is an underlying need to study an individual or single cell as it will provide a better understanding of how it contributes to the entity as a whole. It was found that the utilization of electrochemical techniques could analyze cells without interrupting cellular activity as well as provide a highly resolute spectrum. This analysis method was first completed by Wightman in 1982. In this method of analysis, a carbon microfiber electrode is placed near the studied cell; this electrode can monitor the call via methods of voltammetry or amperometry. Before the measure can be taken, the cell must be stimulated by an ejection pipette to cause a cellular release. This can be cellular release can be measured via the aforementioned methods. From this method, it was seen that instrumental advances were needed in order to perform quality SEE measurements.

=== Single-Molecule Redox Cycling ===
Single-Molecule electrochemistry is an electrochemical technique used to study the faradaic response of redox molecules in electrochemical environments. The ability to study singular molecules gives rise to the potential of developing ultra-sensitive sensors which are necessary in SEE. However, directly detecting the small number of electrons transferred in typical faradaic processes remains challenging: while feasible under cryogenic conditions, it is particularly difficult at room temperature. To date, direct measurement of charge transfer during electrochemical reactions at the single-molecule level remains an incompletely mature mode of electrical signal transduction. This is primarily because conventional electrochemical instruments are incapable of effectively detecting such minute changes. As a result, detecting single-molecule electrochemical reactions generally requires signal amplification strategies, the application of spatial or temporal confinement, or the conversion of electrochemical signals into other forms for indirect measurement. From the work of Bard and Fan, this technique has had large advances with the use of redox cycling. Redox cycling amplifies a charge transfer by reducing and oxidizing a molecule multiple times as it diffuses between electrodes. Specifically in this technique, an insulated nano-electrode tip is placed near a substrate electrode to form an ultra-small electrochemical chamber. Molecules will become trapped in this chamber where the redox cycling and charge amplification will occur, allowing for detection of single molecules. From this technique, the necessary tool of charge amplification of redox reactions helped improve SEE measurements. It has helped increase detection limits, which need to be high for SEE.

== Applications ==
=== Single-Cell Electrochemistry ===
With the advance of nanoscale electrodes, the resolution of SEE has advanced from being able to detect single cells to detecting single molecules within cells. Nanoscale electrodes are small enough they can be inserted into the synapses between neurons, which can be used to detect neurotransmitter concentrations. If the electrode is thin enough, it can be inserted directly into a cell and used to detect concentrations of intracellular molecules, such as metabolites or even DNA.

=== Optoelectrochemical Imaging ===
Plasmonic nanoparticles can be individually analyzed through optoelectrochemical imaging (in which electrochemical processes are measured by optical means). When electrochemistry is performed on a nanoparticle, the refractive index of its environment will change resulting in a shift of the localized surface plasmon resonance. The spectral difference can be measured through characterization techniques such as darkfield microscopy to monitor electrochemical reactions at the surface of plasmonic nanoparticles.

Plasmonics-based electrochemical current microscopy (PECM) measures the contrast that appears from the interference of localized surface plasmon scattered light and reflected light that, like above, is sensitive to changes in the refractive index. This can be used to quantify the electrocatalytic reactions occurring at Pt nanoparticles. Since nanoparticles are inherently heterogenous (which affects catalytic activity), SEE methods can provide more information than traditional methods that measure the average of an ensemble of nanoparticles.

=== Single Enzyme Electron Transferring ===
At present, single entity electrochemistry is not sensitive enough to quantify the turnover of a single enzyme.
