= Extended Wulff constructions =

Shapes for crystals with interfaces and twins

Extended Wulff constructions refers to a number of different ways to model the structure of nanoparticles as well as larger mineral crystals. They can be used to understand the shape of gemstones and crystals with twins, and in other areas such as understanding both the shape and how nanoparticles play a role in the commercial production of chemicals using heterogeneous catalysts. Extended Wulff constructions are variants of the Wulff construction, which is used for a solid single crystal in isolation. They include cases for solid particles on substrates, those with internal boundaries and also when growth is important.

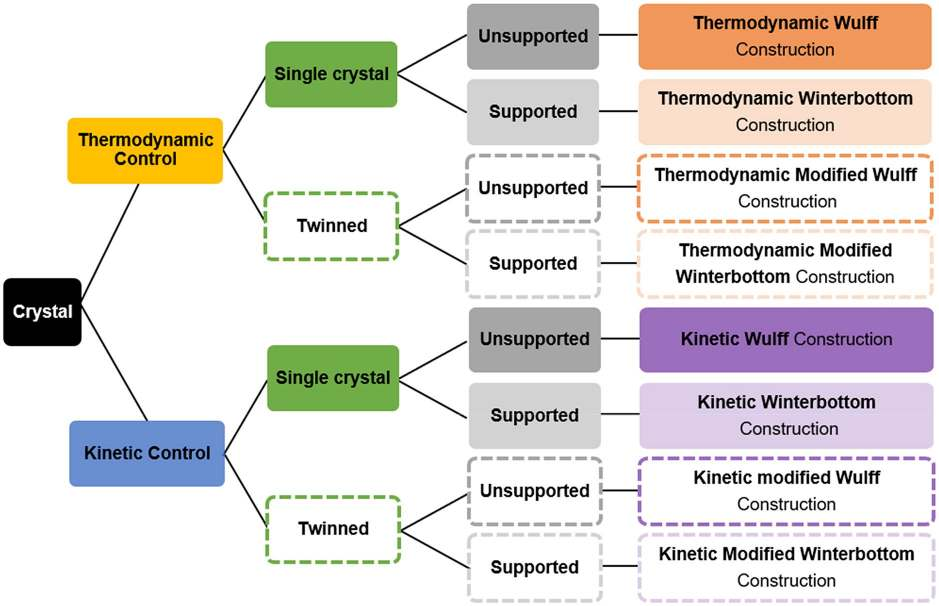
Decision tree for shapes of particles, adapted from Boukouvala, Daniel and Ringe

Depending upon whether there are twins or a substrate, there are different cases as indicated in the decision tree figure. The simplest forms of these constructions yield the lowest Gibbs free energy (thermodynamic) shape, or the stable growth form for an isolated particle; it can be difficult to differentiate between the two in experimental data. The thermodynamic cases involve the surface energy of different facets; the term surface tension refers to liquids, not solids. The shapes found due to growth kinetics involve the growth velocity of the different surface facets.

While the thermodynamic and kinetic constructions are relevant for free standing particles, often in technological applications particles are on supports. An important case is for heterogeneous catalysis, where typically the surface of metal nanoparticles is where chemical reactions are taking place. To optimize the reactions a large metal surface area is desirable, but for stability the nanoparticles need to be supported on a substrate. The problem of the shape on a flat substrate is solved via the Winterbottom construction.

All the above are for single crystals, but it is common to have twins in the crystals. These can occur either by accident (growth twins), or can be an integral part of the structure as in decahedral or icosahedral particles. To understand the shape of particles with twin boundaries a modified Wulff construction is used.

All these add some additional terms to the base Wulff construction. There are related constructions which have been proposed for other cases such as with alloying or when the interface between a nanoparticle and substrate is not flat.

Extended Wulff constructions: the additional, dashed energy and facet would be for an interface.

== General form ==
The thermodynamic Wulff construction describes the relationships between the shape of a single crystal and the surface free energy of different surface facets. It has the form that the perpendicular distance from a common center to all the external facets is proportional to the surface free energy of each one. This can be viewed as a relationship between the different surface energies and the distance from a Wulff center $h_j=\lambda \gamma_j$, where the vector $h_j$ is the "height" of the $j$th face, drawn from the center to the face with a surface free energy of $\gamma_j$, and $\lambda$ a scale. A common approach is to construct the planes normal to the vectors from the center to the surface free energy curve, with the Wulff shape the inner envelope. This is represented in the Wulff construction figure where the surface free energy is in red, and the single crystal shape would be in blue. In a more mathematical formalism it can be written describing the shape as a set of points $S_w$ given by
$$S_w = x:x.\widehat{n} \leq \lambda \gamma(\widehat{n})$$
for all unit vectors $\widehat{n}$.

For the extended constructions, one or more additional terms are included for interface free energies, for instance the $\gamma_i$ marked in purple with dashes in the figure. The additional interfaces may be a solid interface for the Winterbottom case, two interfaces for summertop, and one, two, or three twin boundaries for the modified Wulff construction. Comparable cases are generated when the surface free energy is replaced by a growth velocity, these applying for kinetic shapes.

== Winterbottom construction ==
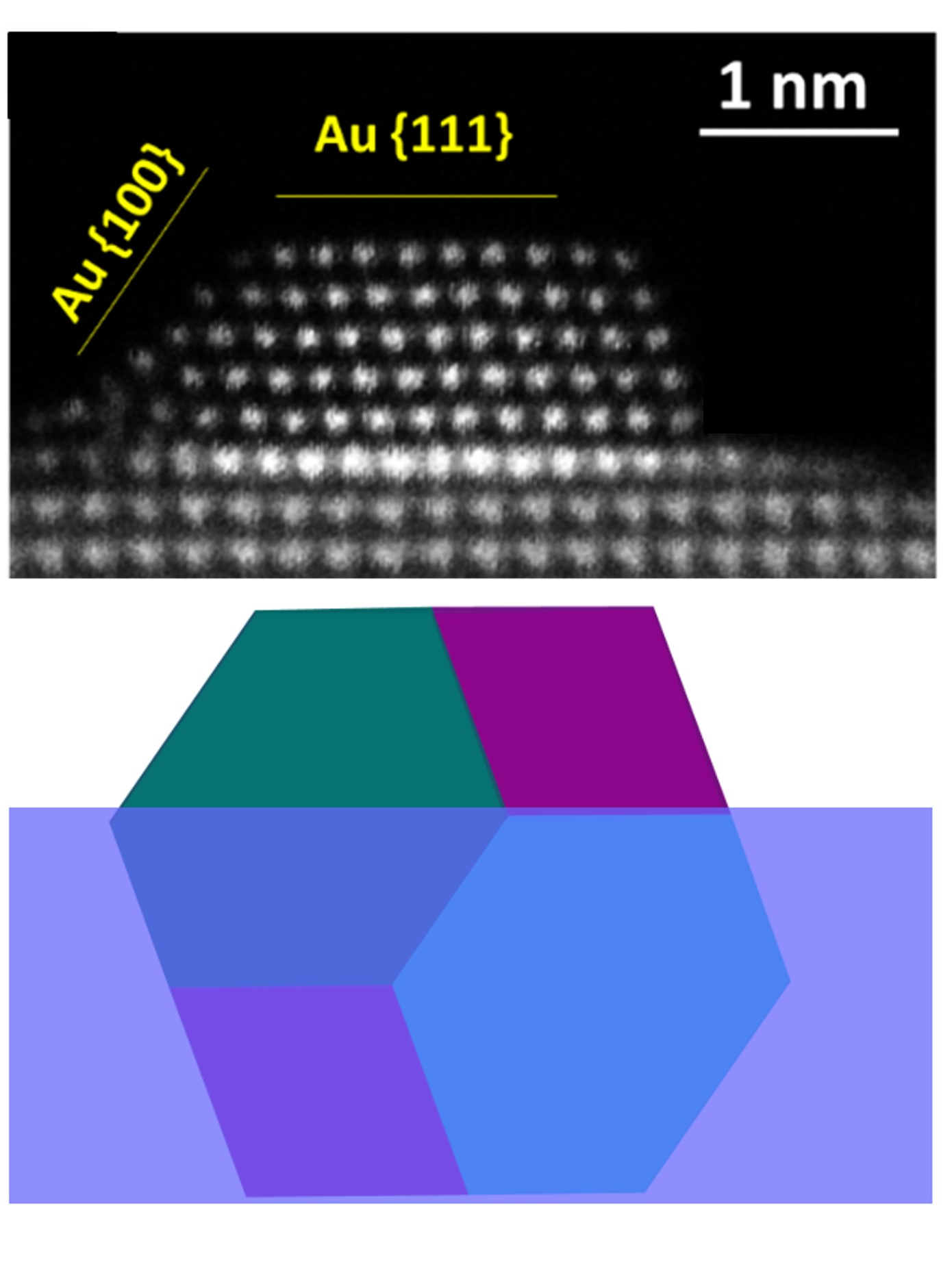
Experimental image of a gold nanoparticle (top) on ceria at the top, and a corresponding Winterbottom model at the bottom with green for (111) and brown form (001 with the substrate in blue).

The Winterbottom construction, named after Walter L. Winterbottom, is the solution for the shape of a solid particle on a substrate, where the substrate is forced to remain flat. It is sometimes called the Kaischew-Winterbottom or Kaischew construction, since it was first analyzed for polyhedral shapes in a less general fashion by Kaischew and later Ernst G. Bauer. However, the proof by Winterbottom is more general.

The Winterbottom construction adds an extra term for the free energy of the interface between a particle and the substrate, the substrate being assumed to stay flat. These shapes are found for nanoparticles supported on substrates such as in heterogeneous catalysis and also nanoparticle superlattices. They look similar to a truncated single particle as shown in the figure for a gold nanoparticle on ceria, and can also resemble that of a liquid drop on a surface. If the energy for the interface is very high, then the particle has the same shape as it would have in isolation, and effectively dewets the substrate. If the energy is very low, then a thin raft is formed on the substrate, effectively wetting the substrate.

The configuration found depends upon the orientation of the substrate, that of the particle, as well as the relative orientation of the two. It is not uncommon to have more than one particle orientation and shape, each being a metastable energy minimum. There is also some dependence upon whether there are steps, strain and anisotropy at the interface. A related form has also been used for precipitates at boundaries, with semi-Wulff construction shapes on both sides.

== Summertop construction ==
This form was proposed as an extension of the Winterbottom construction (and a play on words) by Jean Taylor. It applies to the case of a nanoparticle at a corner. Instead of just using one extra facet for the interface two are included. There are other related extensions, such as solutions in two dimensions for a crystal between two parallel planes.

== Modified Wulff construction ==
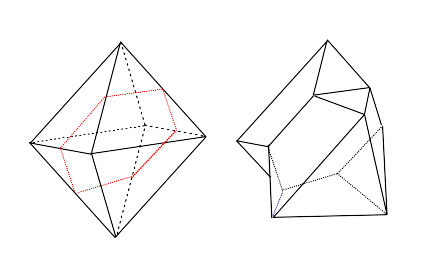
Spinel law contact twinning. A single crystal is shown on the left with the composition plane in red. At right, the crystal has effectively been cut on the composition plane and the front half rotated by 180° to produce a contact twin. This creates reentrants at the top, lower left, and lower right of the composition plane.

In many materials there are twins, which often correspond to a mirroring on a specific plane. For instance, a {111} plane for a face centered material such as gold is the normal twin plane. They often have re-entrant surfaces at the twin boundaries, a phenomenon reported in the 19th century and described in encyclopedias of crystal shapes. The cases with one twin boundary are also called macle twins, although there can be more than one twin boundary. An example of this called the Spinel law contact twinning is shown in the figure. There can also be a series of parallel twins forming what are called Lamellar Twinned Particles, which have been found in experimental samples both large and small. For an odd number of boundaries these all resemble the macle twins; for an even number they are closer to single crystals.

There can also be two, non-parallel twin boundaries on each segment, a total of five twins in the composite particle, which leads to a shape that Cleveland and Uzi Landman called a Marks decahedron when it occurs in face centered cubic materials with five units forming a fiveling cyclic twin. There can also be three twin boundaries per segment where twenty units assemble to form an icosahedral structure. Both the decahedral and icosahedral forms can be the most stable ones at the nanoscale. These forms occur for both elemental nanoparticles as well as alloys and colloidal crystals.

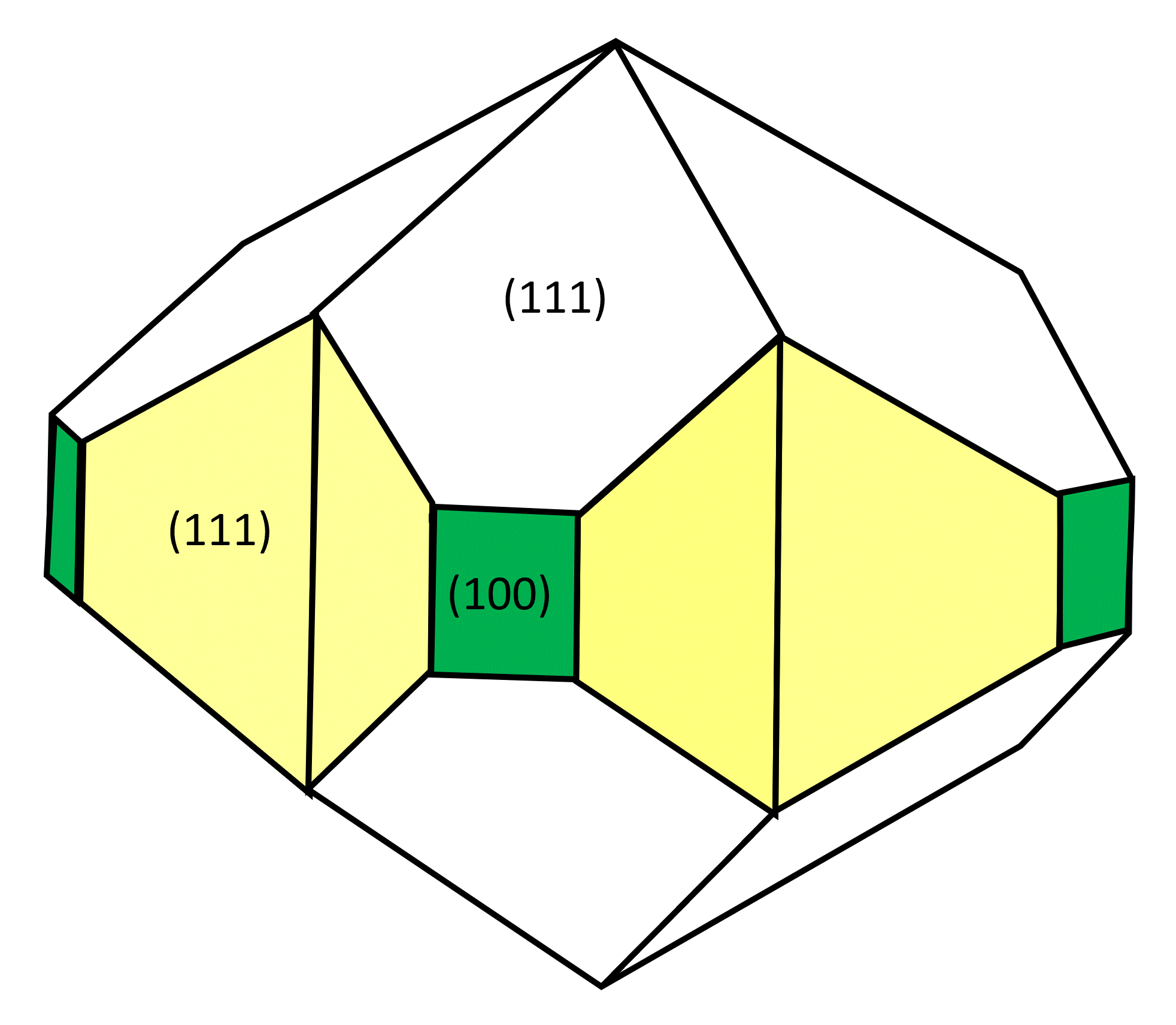
Redrawn version of 1831 sketch of a gold fiveling by Rose, which is a Marks decahedron with $\gamma_{111} \approx 0.7\gamma_{100}$

The approach to model these is similar to the Winterbottom construction, now adding an extra facet of energy per unit area half that of the twin boundary—half so the energy per unit area of the two adjacent segments sums to a full twin boundary energy. With an equal split the facets that make up the twin boundaries are identical for all the segments. Mathematically this is similar to the Wulff construction, with the shape
$$S_w = x:(x-o_m).\widehat{n} \leq \lambda_m \gamma(\widehat{n})$$
for all unit vectors $\widehat{n}$. Here $o_m$ is the origin of the Wulff construction for each segment. In many cases the twin boundary energy is small compared to external surface energy, so a single twin is close to half a single crystal rotated by 180 degrees and $o_m=0$ with all the origins the same; this is often observed experimentally. Five units then form a fiveling, which has reentrant surfaces at the twin boundaries and is shown in the figure of a gold fiveling by Rose, while for three boundaries per unit, a close-to-perfect icosahedron is formed. (An image of an 0.5 cm gold mineral crystal is shown later.) The construction also predicts more complicated shapes composed of combinations of decahedra, icosahedra, and other complex twin-connected shapes, which have been observed experimentally in nanoparticles and were called polyparticles. Other recent examples include bi-decahedra and bi-icosahedra. Extended combinations can lead to complex structures of overlapping five-fold structures in wires.

While the earlier work was for crystals of materials such as silver and gold, more recently there has been work on colloidal clusters of nanoparticles where similar shapes have been observed, although nonequilibrium shapes also occur.

== Kinetic Wulff construction ==
The thermodynamic Wulff and the others above describe the relationship between the shape of a single crystal and the surface free energy of different surface facets. It is named after Georg Wulff, but his paper was not in fact on thermodynamics, but rather on growth kinetics. In many cases growth occurs via the nucleation of small islands on the surface then their sideways growth, either step-flow or layer-by-layer growth. The variant where this type growth dominates is the kinetic Wulff construction.

In the kinetic Wulff case, the distance from the origin to each surface facet is proportional to the growth rate of the facet. This means that fast-growing facets are often not present, for instance often {100} for a face-centered cubic material; the external shape may be dominated by the slowest-growing faces. Note that other facets will reappear if the crystal is annealed when surface diffusion changes the shape towards the equilibrium shape. Most of the shapes in larger mineral crystals are a consequence of kinetic control. Both the surface free energy and growth rate of different surfaces depend strongly upon the presence of adsorbates, so can vary substantially. Similar to the original work by Wulff, it is often unclear whether single crystals have a thermodynamic or kinetic Wulff shape. For reference, the form of the kinetic Wulff construction is given by
$$S_w = x:x.\widehat{n} \leq \lambda v(\widehat{n})$$
for all unit vectors $\widehat{n}$, where $v(\widehat{n})$ is the growth velocity of the facet. This is equivalent to $h_j=\lambda v_j$, where, as above, the $j$ index refers to the facet and $h_j$ is the height from the Wulff center.

There are analogues of all the earlier cases when kinetic control dominates:

- Kinetic Winterbottom: the velocity replaces the surface energies for all the external facets, with the growth rate at the interface zero.
- Kinetic summertop: similar to the Winterbottom, with zero growth rate at the interfaces.
- Kinetic modified Wulff: the velocity replaces the surface energies for all the external facets, with zero growth velocity at the twin boundaries. When kinetic growth dominates, the velocity of the buried twin boundaries is zero. This can lead to cyclic twins with very sharp shapes.

There can also be faster growth at re-entrant surfaces around twin boundaries, at the interface for a Winterbottom case, at dislocations and possibly at disclinations, all of which can lead to different shapes. For instance, faster growth at twin boundaries leads to regular polyhedra such as pentagonal bipyramids for the fivelings with sharp corners and edges, and sharp icosahedral for the particles made of twenty subunits. The pentagonal bipyramids have been frequently observed in growth experiments, dating back to the early work by Shozo Ino and Shiro Ogawa in 1966-67, and are not the thermodynamically stable forms but the kinetic ones. Similar to the misinterpretation of the original paper by Wulff as mentioned above, these sharp shapes have been misinterpreted as being part of the equilibrium shape.

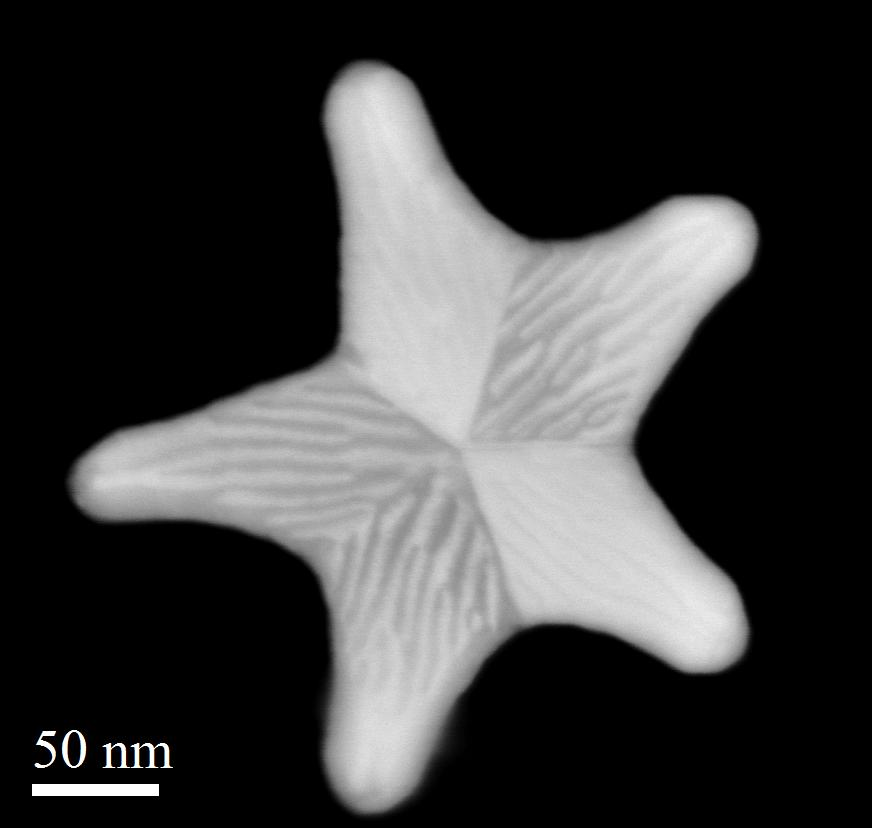
Fiveling (decahedral nanoparticle) showing diffusion growth at tips

For completeness, there is a different type of kinetic control of shapes called diffusion control. This can lead to more complex shapes such as dendrites and others, for instance the star-shaped decahedral nanoparticle shown in the figure.

== Related constructions ==
There are quite a few extensions and related constructions. Most of these to date are for relatively specialized cases. In particular:

- Strain at the particle-substrate interface can lead to changes which have been described in more generalized Winterbottom models or by including a triple-line energy term; the latter has been observed experimentally.
- Modified forms have been developed when there are steps, as this can introduce strain.
- A more complex variational approach can be used to model alloy nanoparticles or when combining the twin-variant and a substrate.
- While the most common use of these constructions are in three dimensions for particles, they can also be used to understand two-dimensional growth shapes, grain boundary faceting, voids when the interface is anisotropic, and for dislocations.

== Caveats ==
Two materials A and B can be miscible when hot, then phase separate to form Janus particles.

These variants of the Wulff construction correlate well to many shapes found experimentally, but do not explain everything. Sometimes the shapes with multiple different units are due to coalescence, sometimes they are less symmetric, or they can be different as in Janus particles (named for the two-headed god) which contain two materials as illustrated in the figure. There are also some assumptions, such as that the substrate remains flat in the Winterbottom construction. This does not have to be the case; the particle can be partially or completely buried in the substrate.

It can also be the case that metastable structures are formed. For instance, during growth at elevated temperatures a neck can form between two particles, and they can start to merge. If the temperature is decreased then diffusion can become slow so this shape can persist.

Finally, the descriptions here work well for particles of size about 5 nm and larger. At smaller sizes more local bonding can become important, so nanoclusters of smaller sizes can be more complex.

== Application relevance ==
=== Heterogeneous catalysts ===
These contain nanoparticles on a support, where either the nanoparticles alone or in combination with the support plays a key role in speeding up a chemical reaction. The support can also play a role in reducing sintering by stabilizing the particles so there is less reduction in their surface area with extended use—larger particles produced by sintering small ones have less surface area for the same total number of atoms.

In addition, the substrate can determine the orientation of the nanoparticles, and combined with what surfaces are exposed in the Winterbottom construction there can be different reactivities; this has been exploited for prototype catalysts.

=== Minerals ===
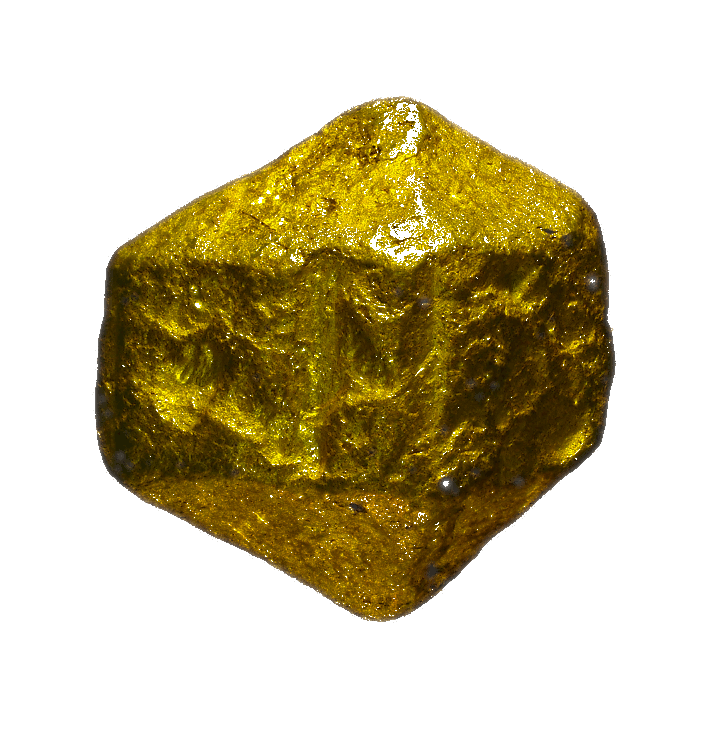
Gold fiveling, 0.5cm tall from Miass, Siberia, Russia, a Marks decahedron

As alluded to earlier, many minerals have crystal twins. The approaches herein provide methods to explain the morphologies for either kinetic or thermodynamic control of shapes found in the literature for marcasite, and by Gustav Rose in 1831 for gold. An image of a rather large fiveling from Miass is shown in the figure.

=== Nucleation ===
At small sizes, particularly for face centered cubic materials, cyclic twins called multiply twinned particles are often of lower energy than single crystals. The main reason is that they have more lower energy surfaces, mainly (111). This is balanced by elastic deformation which raises the energy. At small sizes the surface energy dominates, so icosahedral particles are lowest in energy. As the size increases the decahedral ones become lowest in energy, then at the largest size it is single crystals. Both the decahedral and icosahedral particles have shapes determined by the modified Wulff construction. Note that due to the discrete nature of atoms there can be deviations from the continuum shapes at very small sizes.

=== Plasmonics ===
The optical response of nanoparticles depends upon their shape, size and the materials. For instance, rod shapes which are very anisotropic can be grown using decahedral seeds if the growth on (100) facets is slow, kinetic Wulff shapes. These have quite different optical responses than icosahedra, which are close to spherical. Cubes can also be produced if the (111) growth rate is very fast, and these have yet further optical responses.

== See also ==
- Chemical physics – Subdiscipline of chemistry and physics
- Cluster (chemistry) – Collection of bound atoms or molecules
- Cluster (physics) – Small collection of atoms or molecules
- Crystal habit – Visible shape of a mineral
- Crystal twinning – Phenomenon in crystallization
- Icosahedral twins – Structure found in atomic clusters and nanoparticles
- Nanomaterials – Materials with granular size 1 to 100 nm
- Nanowire – Wire with a diameter in the nanometres
- Surface stress – Change of surface energy with strain
