= Ya Wang =

Chinese-American mechanical engineer

Ya Wang is a Chinese and American mechanical engineer, and an associate professor of mechanical engineering at Texas A&M University, where she holds the Leland T. Jordan Career Development Professorship. Topics in her research include nanomedicine and nanorobotics, magnetic-plasmonic bifunctional nanoparticles, and the applications of piezoelectric ceramics in vibration control, energy harvesting, and as sensors in extreme environments. She has also helped develop smart wearable systems for assessing the progress of Parkinson's disease.

== Education and career ==
Wang studied mechanical engineering at Shandong University in China, graduating with a bachelor's degree in 2004. After a 2007 master's degree at the University of Puerto Rico, she completed her Ph.D. in mechanical engineering in 2012 at Virginia Tech. Her doctoral dissertation, Simultaneous Energy Harvesting and Vibration Control via Piezoelectric Materials, was supervised by Daniel Inman.

After postdoctoral research at the University of Michigan, and working at Stony Brook University as an assistant professor of mechanical engineering from 2013 to 2018, she moved to her present position at Texas A&M University in 2018.

== Recognition ==
Wang received a National Science Foundation CAREER Award in 2018, for a project involving the use of nanoparticles to assist in neuroregeneration. In 2025 she received the Presidential Early Career Award for Scientists and Engineers.

She was elected as an ASME Fellow by the American Society of Mechanical Engineers (ASME) in 2022.
