= Magnetic-plasmonic bifunctional nanoparticles =

Magnetic-plasmonic (bifunctional) nanoparticles (MP-NPs) consist of both optical (plasmonic) and magnetic components and thus, has the functionality of both of these components. These nanoparticles may take many different forms/shapes including dimer, core-shell, janus, nanorod/wire and nanostar. Typically, the magnetic components consists of iron oxide or nickel while the plasmonic component is oftentimes a metal like gold, silver or another plasmonic nanomaterial. Due to the combination of these two materials into a hybrid nanostructure, the material may be interacted with using either light or magnetic fields and so, are commonly used in biomedical applications that require optical sensing/imaging/heating, magnetic stimulation/manipulation, or both of these functionalities. An example utilizing both of these functionalities is that MP-NPs can attach to biological entities and separate them under an external magnetic field while simultaneously detecting their chemical nature via optical sensing. These dual functionalities are especially useful when studying tissues deep within tissue.

== Applications ==
Owing to their bifunctionality, magnetic-plasmonic nanoparticles can be used for a wide range of applications. For example, many of the applications of plasmonic nanoparticles including surface-enhance Raman scattering (SERS), dark-field microscopy, photothermal therapy, drug delivery, nanomedicine, chemotherapy and plasmonic solar cells. As well as applications of magnetic nanoparticles including magnetic hyperthermia, magnetic resonance imaging contrast agent, and in magnetic drug delivery. Moreover, a number of applications could potentially be carried out simultaneously such as magnetic/optical dual-modal imaging.
