= Emilie Ringe =

Canadian chemist

- Born: 1984 (age 41–42); Quebec
- Education: Northwestern University
- Scientific career
- Workplaces: University of Cambridge; Rice University
- Thesis: Building the Nanoplasmonics Toolbox Through Shape Modeling and Single Particle Optical Studies. (2012)
- Doctoral advisor: Laurence D. Marks, Richard P. Van Duyne
- Other academic advisors: James A. Ibers

Emilie Ringe (born 1984) is a Canadian chemist who is a professor of synthetic and natural nanomaterials at the University of Cambridge and a Fellow of Gonville and Caius College. She was selected by Chemical & Engineering News as one of its "Talented Twelve" young scientists in 2021.

== Early life and education ==
Ringe grew up in Quebec, and started college at McGill University before moving to Northwestern University, where she graduated in chemistry. She remained at Northwestern for her graduate studies. Her doctoral research developed structure-function relationships of nanoparticles, and how structure and composition impacted the optoelectronic properties. During her graduate studies she started working with electron microscopy.

== Research and career ==
Ringe joined the University of Cambridge as a Newton International Fellow. She held a joint position at Trinity Hall, where she served as a Gott Research Fellow. She moved to Rice University in 2014, where she established the Electron Microscopy Centre. Ringe returned to the University of Cambridge in 2018, where she held positions in both the Department of Materials and Department of Earth Sciences. Ringe studies plasmonic nanoparticles. When light of the appropriate frequency shines on these plasmonic nanoparticles the nearby electrons start to resonate (so-called localized surface plasmon resonances), and use the light to drive chemical reactions across their surfaces. Plasmonic nanoparticles are typically made of rare and expensive metals, and can suffer from oxidation that affect their optical properties. Ringe was the first to show that magnesium can form effective plasmonic nanoparticles, with different sizes of nanoparticles absorbing light from the ultraviolet to the infrared region of the spectrum. Thin oxide layer forms on the surface of the magnesium nanoparticles, which makes them air stable. By attaching metals to the nanoparticles, Ringe believes they will be useful in photocatalysis or photothermal therapy.

Ringe was awarded a European Research Council Starting Grant to investigate naturally occurring plasmonics in 2019. In 2021, Ringe was selected by Chemical & Engineering News as one of twelve "talented young scientists who are trying to solve formidable global problems." The same year Ringe received The Journal of Physical Chemistry (JPC) Lectureship Award.

Ringe has developed scientific teaching materials for people with visual disabilities. She created Crystal Creator, a user-friendly graphic interface to teach crystal structures that makes use of Wulff constructions. In 2025 Ringe received the Royal Microscopical Society's Award for Innovation in Applied Microscopy for Engineering, Physical and Material Sciences.

== Selected publications ==
- Bhavya Sharma; Renee R. Frontiera; Henry, Anne-Isabelle; Ringe, Emilie; Van Duyne, Richard (2012). "SERS: Materials, applications, and the future". Materials Today. 15 (1–2): 16–25. doi:10.1016/s1369-7021(12)70017-2. Wikidata Q63343866.
- Ganesh R Bhimanapati; Zhong Lin; Meunier, Vincent; et al. (2015). "Recent Advances in Two-Dimensional Materials beyond Graphene". ACS Nano. 9 (12): 11509–11539. doi:10.1021/acsnano.5b05556. PMID 26544756. Wikidata Q38627034.
- Xingli Wang; Yongji Gong; Gang Shi; et al. (2014). "Chemical vapor deposition growth of crystalline monolayer MoSe2". ACS Nano. 8 (5): 5125–5131. doi:10.1021/nn501175k. PMID 24680389. Wikidata Q87552291.
- Ringe, Emilie; Jeffrey M. McMahon; Kwonnam Sohn; Claire Cobley; Xia, Yòunán; Jiaxing Huang; Schatz, George; Marks, Laurence Daniel; Van Duyne, Richard (2010). "Unraveling the Effects of Size, Composition, and Substrate on the Localized Surface Plasmon Resonance Frequencies of Gold and Silver Nanocubes: A Systematic Single-Particle Approach". The Journal of Physical Chemistry C. 114 (29): 12511–12516. doi:10.1021/jp104366r. Wikidata Q60143463.
