= Winterbotham =

Winterbotham is a surname. Notable people with the surname include:

- Arthur Brend Winterbotham (1838–1892), English cloth manufacturer and politician
- Arthur Winterbotham (cricketer) (1864–1936), English cricketer
- F. W. Winterbotham (1897–1990), World War II British intelligence officer
- Harold St. John Loyd Winterbotham (1879–1946), British surveyor and soldier
- Henry Selfe Page Winterbotham (1837–1873), English lawyer and politician
- Joseph Winterbotham (1852-1925), American manufacturer and arts patron
- Neil Winterbotham, British fashion entrepreneur
- Percival Winterbotham (1883–1925), English cricketer
- Rue Winterbotham Carpenter (1876-1931), American art collector and philanthropist, daughter of Joseph
- Russell R. Winterbotham (1904–1971), American writer
- Sam Winterbotham (born 1973), British tennis coach
- William Winterbotham (1763–1829), British Baptist minister and a political prisoner

== See also ==
- Winterbottom
