= Drug vectorization =

Targeting technique in pharmacology

In pharmacology and medicine, vectorization of drugs refers to (intracellular) targeting with plastic, noble metal or silicon nanoparticles or liposomes to which pharmacologically active substances are reversibly bound or attached by adsorption.

CNRS researchers have devised a way to overcome the problem of multidrug resistance using polyalkyl cyanoacrylate (PACA) nanoparticles as "vectors".

As a developing concept, drug nanocarriers are expected to play a major role in delivering multiple drugs to tumor tissues by overcoming semi-permeable membranes and biological barriers such as the blood–brain barrier.

== See also ==
- Vector (molecular biology)
- Cancer treatment
- Nanomedicine
- Nanobiotechnology
- Paul Ehrlich#Magic bullet
- Gold nanobeacons
