= Gold nanoparticles in chemotherapy =

Drug delivery technique using gold nanoparticles as vectors

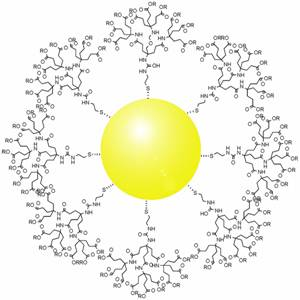
Gold nanoparticles

Gold nanoparticles in chemotherapy and radiotherapy is the use of colloidal gold in therapeutic treatments, often for cancer or arthritis. Gold nanoparticle technology shows promise in the advancement of cancer treatments. Some of the properties that gold nanoparticles possess, such as small size, non-toxicity and non-immunogenicity make these molecules useful candidates for targeted drug delivery systems. With tumor-targeting delivery vectors becoming smaller, the ability to by-pass the natural barriers and obstacles of the body becomes more probable. To increase specificity and likelihood of drug delivery, tumor specific ligands may be grafted onto the particles along with the chemotherapeutic drug molecules, to allow these molecules to circulate throughout the tumor without being redistributed into the body.

== Physical properties ==
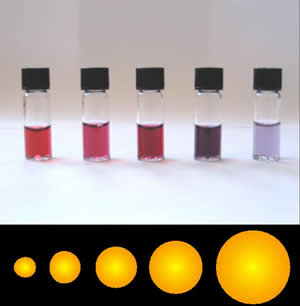
Solutions of gold nanoparticles of various sizes. The size difference causes the difference in colors.

=== Size ===
Gold nanoparticles range in size depending on which therapy they are being used for. In photothermal cancer therapy, many gold nanoparticle molecules are used in each test and they must all be uniform in size. Including PEG coating, the nanoparticles measured to be ~130 nm in diameter. Gold nanoparticles that act as drug delivery systems in conjugation with chemotherapeutic drugs typically range in size from 10 to 100 nm.

Surface area plays a very important role in drug delivery and per mg of gold, as diameters decrease, the surface areas needed to transport drugs increase to the point where a single 1mL volume of 1.8 nm spherical gold nanoparticles have the same surface area as a cell phone.

Drug vectorization requires greater specificity, and are synthesized within the single digit measurements ranging from 3-7 nm.

Antibacterial treatments are testing different sizes for cell type targeting; 10, 20 and 40 nm.

=== Color ===
Due to the ability to tune the size and absorption of AuNPs, these molecules can vary in the colors they emit. Colors of AuNP solutions typically range from wine red to pale blue. These colors play a necessary role in the synthesis of AuNPs as indicators of reduction. The color of AuNPs can be modified by the application of pressure which reddish the nanoparticles.

=== Synthesis ===
For more on synthesis of AuNPs for medical use, see Colloidal gold

Other synthesis may include cell type targeting. A tumor consists of a multitude of cell types, and thus targeting a single type of cell is ineffective and potentially dangerous. At most, this type of targeting would only have a minor effect on killing the tumor. Tumors are constantly changing and thus phenotype targeting is rendered useless. Two main problems persist: how to get to the target and how to destroy a variety of cells.

== Treatments ==
=== Photothermal cancer therapy ===
A direct method of accessing and destroying tumour cells can be accomplished by photothermal cancer therapy or photodynamic therapy (PDT). This procedure is known to treat small tumours that are difficult to access and avoids the drawbacks (adverse effects) of conventional methods, including the unnecessary destruction of healthy tissues. The cells are destroyed by exposure to light, rupturing membranes causing the release of digestive enzymes. AuNPs have high absorption cross sections requiring only minimal input of irradiation energy. Human breast carcinoma cells infused with metal nanoparticles in vitro have been shown to have an increase in morbidity with exposure to near infrared (NIR). Short term exposure in vivo (4–6 minutes) to NIR had undergone the same effect. Hirsch et al observed that extreme heating in tumours would cause irreversible tissue damage including coagulation, cell shrinkage and loss of nuclear straining. Results of their in vivo nanoshell therapy of mice revealed penetration of the tumor ~5mm.The metal particles were tuned to high absorption and scattering, resulting in effective conversion of light into heat covering a large surface area. The El-Sayed group studied AuNP effects in vitro and in vivo. They determined that the NIR wavelengths were converted into heat on the picosecond timescale, allowing for short exposure of CW to minimize possible exposure to healthy cells. In vitro, photothermal therapy was used in oral epithelial cell lines, (HSC 313 and HOC 3 Clone 8) and one benign epithelial cell line (HaCaT). El-Sayed et al found that the malignant cells that had undergone incubation in AuNPs conjugated with anti-epithelial growth factor receptor (EGFR) required half the energy to destroy a cell than a benign cell. Their material included gold coated silica nanoshells that could selectively absorb NIR waves. The particles were tuned by varying the thickness of the Au shell and changing the size of the silica core. In exposing these particles to NIR, the efficacy of Au was measured through the decrease of EFGR in oral squamous carcinoma cells. There are various biotechnological advances for in vivo delivery of drugs. To effectively target the malignant cells, the AuNPs were conjugated by polyethylene glycol, a process known as PEGylation. This masks the foreign particles from the immune system such that it arrives at its destination and increases circulation time in the system. Antibody conjugation lines the surface of the nanoparticle with cell markers to limit spread only to malignant cells. In vivo testing of mice that developed murine colon carcinoma tumour cells. They were injected with the solution of AuNPs that were allowed to spread after 6 hours. Surrounding cells were swabbed with PEG and exposed to laser treatment for detection of abnormal heating indicating areas where Au nanoshells may have gathered. The injected area was also swabbed with PEG to maximize light penetration.

Despite the unquestionable success of gold nanorods or nanoshells as photothermal agents in preclinical research, they have yet to obtain the approval for clinical use because their size is above the renal excretion threshold. In 2019, the first NIR-absorbing plasmonic ultrasmall-in-nano architecture has been reported, and jointly combine: (i) an efficient photothermal conversion suitable for multiple hyperthermia treatments, and (ii) renal excretion of the building blocks after the therapeutic action.

=== Radiofrequency therapy ===
X-ray radiography procedures involves the diagnosis of cancer cells through the process of image acquisition. These techniques rely on the absorption of x-rays on the exposed tissue in order to improve image quality. In certain radiological procedures such as Radiofrequency therapy, a contrast agent is injected into the targeted cancer tissue and result in increased x-ray attenuation.

Radiofrequency therapy treatment involves the destruction of tumor cancer tissue cells through the differential heating of cancer tissue by radio-frequency diathermy. This differential heating is a result of the blood supply in the body carrying away the heat and cooling the heated tissue.

Gold nanoparticles are excellent absorbers of x-rays, due to its high atomic number of ^{197}Au. This allows for a higher mass of the element, providing for a greater area of x-ray absorption. By acting as a contrast agent and injected into cancerous tumor cells, it would result in a higher dose of the cancerous tissue being exposed during radiotherapy treatment. Additionally gold nanoparticles are more efficiently removed from cells of healthy tissue, in comparison with cancer cells - a feature that makes them a promising radiosensitizers

=== Angiogenesis therapy ===
Angiogenesis is a process involving the formation of new blood vessels from pre-existing vessels. It involves the degradation of the extracellular matrix, activation, migration, proliferation, and differentiation of endothelial cells into vessels. It is said to play a large part in the growth and spread of cancer cells.

The process of angiogenesis involves the use of both promoters and inhibitors, balancing the process by only forming new blood vessels when needed. Examples of promoters include Vascular Endothelial Growth Factor (VEGF) and fibroblast growth factor (FGF) Examples of inhibitors include Vascular Endothelial Growth Factor Receptor 1, etc.

Tumor progression occurs as a result of the transition from a tumor in the dormant proliferation stage to the active stage as a result of oxygen and nutrients. This active stage leads to a state of cellular hypoxia, which causes an increased regulation of pro-angiogenesis proteins such as VEGF. This results in the spreading of inflammatory proteins and cancer cells alongside the newly created blood vessels.

AuNPs have the ability to inhibit angiogenesis by directly coordinating to heparin binding growth factors. They inhibit phosphorylation of proteins responsible for angiogenesis in a dose dependent matter. At concentrations 335-670 nM, almost complete inhibition of phosphorylation was observed. As a consequence of angiogenesis, rheumatoid arthritis has been found to develop due to the greater ability to spread inflammatory proteins. Through the inhibition of angiogenesis, the reduction of rheumatoid arthritis is prevalent. In addition, angiogenic inhibitors have a critical limitation due to the instability of biological conditions and high dosage required. To counter this, an emerging strategy for the development of therapies targeting tumor-associated angiogenesis through the use of nanotechnology and anti-angiogenic agents was developed, known as anti-angiogenic therapy. This approach solved the limitation instability by speeding up the delivery of angiogenesis inhibitors.

Gold nanoparticles display anti-angiogenic properties by inhibiting the function of pro-angiogenic heparin-binding growth factors (HG – GFs), with prime examples being the vascular endothelial growth factor 165 (VEGF165) and the basic fibroblast growth factor (bFGF) - both of which are pro-angiogenic promoters. Studies by Rochelle R. Arvizo, et al. have shown that the use of AuNPs of various size and surface charge plays an important role in its inhibitory effects.

In today's biological fields, the use of nanotechnology has allowed for the indirect use of AuNPs to deliver DNA to mammalian cells; thereby reducing tumor agents and increasing efficiency of electron transfer by modulating the activity of glucose oxidase. Current ongoing research by the Mayo Clinic laboratories includes the examination of AuNPs as messengers to deliver reagents capable of manipulating the angiogenic response in vivo.

Current angiogenic inhibitors used today which are approved by the USFDA to treat cancer is Ayastin, Nexavar, Sutent and Affinitor.

=== Anti-bacterial therapy ===
Gold nanoparticles are used as bacteria targeting particles in antibacterial therapy. The therapy targets bacteria with light absorbing gold nanoparticles (10 nm, 20 nm, 40 nm) conjugated with specific antibodies, thus selectively kill bacteria using laser.

Studies has shown the effectiveness of this method on killing Staphylococcus aureus, which is significant human pathogen responsible for a wide range of diseases such as skin and wound infections, toxic shock syndrome, septic arthritis, endocarditis, and osteomyelitis. In this system, the bacteria damage is caused by inducing strong laser which leads to overheating effects accompanied by the bubble-formation phenomena around clustered gold nanoparticles.

The selective targeting of S. aureus was performed using a monoclonal antibody to one of the major surface-clustered proteins, protein A (spa), which is linked to the peptidoglycan portion of the cell wall. Monoclonal antibodies ensure the targeting of the specific cell, which is essential to this mechanism. Killing efficiency depends on local overheating effects accompanied by the bubble-formation phenomena, the bubble formation would enhance the PT killing effect.Better heating efficiency results from an enhanced ability to confine the nanosecond laser-pulse within the nanocluster's size. Overlapping of bubbles from different nanoparticles within the nanoclusters decreases the bubble-formation threshold. An increase in the cluster's average local absorption and its potential redshifting (from 525 nm for a single gold spherical nanoparticle to 700–800 nm for nanoclusters) in response to plasmon-plasmon resonance.

=== Drug vectorization ===
Another way in which AuNPs can be used in cancer therapy is as agents for targeted drug delivery. Research shows that AuNPs can be easily functionalized and conjugated with a variety of molecules, including chemotherapeutic drugs such as Doxorubicin. One major complication with the current methods of treating cancer with chemotherapy is that treatment is not optimized to specifically target cancer cells and the widespread distribution of chemotherapeutic drugs throughout the body can cause harmful side effects such as naseua, hair loss, and cardiotoxicity. Since many of the characteristics of AuNPs allow them to target cancer cells specifically and accumulate within tumor cells, these molecules can act as tumor-targeting drug delivery systems. Once within the tumor microenvironment, these complexes dissociate and release the chemotherapeutic, allowing the drug to take effect and eventually cause apoptosis.

Gold nanoparticles have their advantages in drug vectorization. They can pack several different sizes and types of dendrimers and several different types of ligands in order to effectively treat different types of cancers. For example, research shows that 80~90% of breast cancer's tumor cells have estrogen receptors and 60~70% of prostate cancer's tumor cells have androgen receptors. These significant amount of hormone receptors play a role in intermolecular actions. This role is now used by targeting and therapeutic ligands on gold nanoparticles to target tissue-selective anti-tumor drug delivery. In order to have multiple targeting and therapeutic ligands bind with gold nanoparticles, the gold nanoparticles must first undergo polymer stabilization. Then, anti-estrogen molecules with thiolated PEG are bound to gold nanoparticles via Au-S bonds, forming thiolate protected gold nanoparticles.

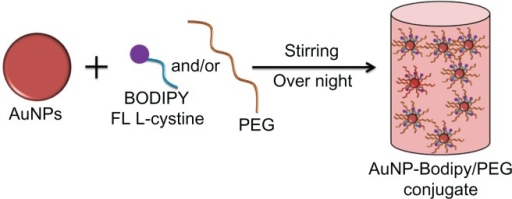
PEGylated gold nanoparticles

Docetaxel is packed into PEGylated gold nanoparticles Docetaxel is an anti-mitotic chemotherapy medicine which showing great performance in clinical trial. Docetaxel was approved by FDA, to treat several different kinds of cancer. i.e. breast cancer(include locally advanced or metastatic).

== Market approval ==
A Pilot Study of AuroLase™ Therapy (gold nano shells) in refractory and/or recurrent tumors of the head and neck was completed in 2009 (Note: (NCT00848042)) and two trials are currently using AuroLase™ therapy for the treatment of primary/metastatic lung cancer (Note: (NCT01679470)) and for prostate cancer. (Note: (NCT02680535)) Other gold nanoparticles on the market are mostly for synthesis of nanoparticle complexes in research. Nanocomposix specializes in the production of various sizes of nanoparticles, controlled by varying the concentrations of reducing reagent and HAuCl4.

Sigma Aldrich offers six different sizes of spherical gold nanoparticles and have developed gold nanourchins for similar usage. The surface causes a red shift in the surface plasmon peak as compared to spherical gold nanoaprticles.

Nanopartz offers gold nanoparticles and gold nanorods for preclinical in vivo therapeutics that have been used extensively in preclinical therapeutics including photothermal hyperthermia and chemotherapeutic drug delivery. The pilot study using the Ntracker gold nanorods was completed in 2012 and was used on seven canines with varying degrees of solid cancer tumors. The results showed significant loading of the gold nanorods after intravenous injection into the cancer tumors and significant heating of the tumors from an external laser. Images are found at

== Adverse effects and limitations ==
=== Shape ===
Depending on the shape of the molecule, the absorbance will vary, i.e. spherical particles will absorb wavelengths in the NIR region with a relatively low absorbance compared to long rods. Chan et al observed that 50 nm spherical nanoparticles were taken up more efficiently than both larger and smaller particles of the same shape. In regards to size, the spheres were taken up more efficiently than the rods. Ability of greater uptake of nanoshells into the cell will localize in the perinuclear membrane and accumulate to deliver toxic effects.

=== Charge ===
Electrostatic interactions were also investigated by Rotello et al by conjugating AuNPs with anionic and cationic functional groups. Their results showed that toxicity was more established in AUNPs conjugated with cationic functional groups as a consequence of electrostatic interactions with the anionic cell membrane.

=== Concentration ===
The concentrations of gold nanoparticles in biological systems for practical usage range from 1-100 nanoparticles per cell. High concentrations may lead to adverse effects for cell structure and function, which may not appear non-toxic in assays but preparation of the particles have been found to produce abnormal effects in the cell. If large concentrations quickly clear the blood vessels, the nanoshells may accumulate in major organs (mainly the liver and spleen). Residual concentrations of these particles were also found in kidneys, lungs, muscle, brain, and bone of mice after 28 days. The concentration of the solution injected intravenously 2.4*10^{11} nanoshells/mL. Even without complete clearance from the system, the nanoshells did not cause any physiological complications in the mice. Su et al observed a correlation with the concentration of Au_{3}Cu and cell damage. Cells were incubated in concentrations of 0.001 and 200 mg mL^{−1} Au_{3}Cu. They concluded a 15% cell viability and dose dependent cell damage. Reduction in cell viability was detected in vivo experiments; also related to dosage. Cytotoxicity is not a major concern in the usage of AuNPs, as they localize in the vesicles and cytoplasm as opposed to the nucleus. Thus, no complications spawned due to their aggregation in these parts of the cell.

=== Heating ===
Two key factors to consider when irradiating gold nanoparticles in cancer cells are the lattice cooling rate and lattice heat content. The lattice cooling rate is how fast heat in the particle is distributed to its surroundings. If the cooling rate for a particle is too low, the lattice heat content can be increased with moderate energy radiation (40 μJ/fs with 100-fs laser at 800 nm) to the point where gold nanorods can be melted to create spherical nanoparticles which become photothermally inactive. This decomposition has been shown using gold nanorods coated with phosphatidylcholine ligands in HeLa cells using a pulsed laser and were no longer useful for treatment due to their low NIR radiation absorbance. High energy laser pulses have also been shown to fragment nanorods into smaller particles. While these structural changes induced by laser pulses could be used to deactivate the photothermal effects of these particles after treatment, the resulting spherical particles or other particle fragments could lead to complications during or after treatment when gold nanoparticles are used for clinical treatment and imaging of cancer cells.

A limitation of photothermal chemotherapy using gold nanoparticles involves the choice of laser when conducting treatment. Pulsed lasers offer very selective treatment of cancer cells within a small, localized area, but can lead to potential destruction of particles and have a low heating efficiency due to heat lost during the single pulse excitation. Continuous wave lasers have a higher heating efficiency and work better in heating larger areas with lower risk of destroying the nanoparticles being heated. However, treatment with continuous wave lasers are much longer compared to treatment with a pulsed laser. A limitation of photothermal therapy with respect to the laser used is the depth of the tumor being treated. Most lasers used to induce tumor ablation using gold nanoparticles can only reach several centimeters into soft tissue, making it impossible to reach tumors farther in the body. Finding a way to carry out therapy in cells farther into the body without damaging surrounding cells is essential to making this technique viable as a cancer treatment in the future.

=== Toxicity ===
==== Toxic precursors ====
Studies in human leukemia cells revealed that prolonged exposure in AuNPs did not harm the cells, even at ~100 μM of Au. Rather they reduced the amount of reactive oxygen species in the cell. However, precursors to AuNP synthesis (CTAB and HAuCl_{4}) were found to be toxic at small concentrations (10 μM); free CTAB especially. Studies in HeLa cells by Niidome et al further support this statement by examining the correlation with the removal of excess CTAB and cell viability rose to 90%.

==== Toxicity of nanoparticles in vivo and in vitro ====
After using nanoparticles for photothermal therapy, it has been shown in vitro that high concentrations of reactive oxygen species (ROS) are formed within the treated cancer cells. While these species are not of concern to the dead cancer cells, they can cause oxidative stress in surrounding healthy cells if enough ROS are created leading to healthy cell death. This oxidative stress can be passivated using polymers as reducing agents (after degradation of the nanoparticle) and damage from ROS can be reduced using targeted uptake of the nanoparticles to the cancer cells. The mechanism for the oxidative stress caused by nanoparticles in the body is still the subject of study and provides a possible limitation when using gold nanoparticles with radiation within the body.

While there are many in vitro studies of gold nanoparticles used for chemotherapy, in vivo studies are both rare and often report conflicting results. For example, one in vivo study has shown that 13-nm gold nanoparticles circulated in the bloodstream often "accumulate in the liver and spleen and…have long blood circulation times." Also, nanoparticles from 8 to 37 nanometers have been shown to cause abnormal symptoms leading to death in mice due to medical complications in the spleen, liver, and lungs. Yet, other studies have shown that 20 nm gold nanoparticles can pass into the retina without causing any cytotoxic effects and nanoparticles of 13 nm diameter were not toxic in the body. Many argue that these results differ due to different concentrations on nanoparticles used for these experiments and requires further research.

Biosafety and biokinetics investigations on biodegradable ultrasmall-in-nano architectures have demonstrated that gold nanoparticles are able to avoid metal accumulation in organisms through escaping by the renal pathway.

Part of the issue with these studies is the lack of reliable methods for determining the uptake of gold nanoparticles in vivo without examining the tumor site post-mortem. Gold nanoparticle uptake in cells is often carried out by examining the organs of injected mice post-mortem. This technique cannot be replicated during clinical trials, so new methods need to be developed to determine the uptake of cells to avoid higher concentrations of gold nanoparticles in the body leading to toxic effects. One recently suggested method to counter this limitation is radiolabeling. The uptake of thiolated gold nanoparticles has recently been monitored using 111In-labeled polymer shells that surround the gold nanoparticle and shows a possible way around this problem, but these polymer shells can be removed from the particle making a more stable labeling system required for these kinds of studies.

== Other uses ==
The ligand used to decrease aggregation of gold nanorods.

Gold nanoparticles may be used in an indirectly therapeutic way. The issue of angiogenesis describes the formation of new blood vessels, which not only increased spread of cancerous cells, but may proliferate the spread of proteins responsible for rheumatoid arthritis. As AuNPs reduce angiogenesis, rheumatoid arthritis is reduced as a result. Chamberland et al studied the use of anti-TNF conjugated gold nanorods (AuNRs) ex vivo in rat tail joints to reduce the effect of rheumatoid arthritis. They observed the effects of the drug delivery system via PAT technology. The properties of the AuNRs found to be the most efficient had measurements of 45 x 15 nm with an absorption peak of 660 nm. This tuning allowed for better contrast between the targeted areas and intra-articular tissue. Thus, the etanercept conjugated AuNRs were seen to increase the light sensitivity. The imaging technique provides greater opportunities for sensitive in vivo drug tracking in biothechnology.

HIV

Several valences of AuNPs were found to inhibit HIV fusion. 2-nm AuNP-mercaptobenzoic acid were conjugated to a derivative of a known CCR5 antagonist, which is a small molecule that antagonize CCR5 receptor, and CCR5 is commonly used by HIV to enter the cell. The CCR5 antagonist would bind to CCR5, leaving no spots for HIV to bind. This will ultimately lead to an effect that restrict HIV infection.

Hepatitis B

Prepared AuNPs-Hepatitis B virus (HBV) DNA gene probes could be used to detect HBV DNA directly. The detection-visualized fluorescence-based method is highly sensitive, simple, low cost, which could potentially apply to multi-gene detection chips. The probe used here is essentially a biosensor, to specifically detect a certain material.

Tuberculosis

A successful application of the AuNP-nanoprobe colorimetric method to clinical diagnosis reported by Baptista et al. was the sensitive detection in clinical samples of Mycobacterium tuberculosis, the cause of human tuberculosis.

== See also ==
- Colloidal gold
- Chemotherapy
