= Plasmon coupling =

Plasmon coupling is a phenomenon that occurs when two or more plasmonic particles approach each other to a distance below approximately one diameter's length. Upon the occurrence of plasmon coupling, the resonance of individual particles start to hybridize, and their resonance spectrum peak wavelength will shift (either blueshift or redshift), depending on how surface charge density distributes over the coupled particles. At a single particle's resonance wavelength, the surface charge densities of close particles can either be out of phase or in phase, causing repulsion or attraction and thus leading to increase (blueshift) or decrease (redshift) of hybridized mode energy. The magnitude of the shift, which can be the measure of plasmon coupling, is dependent on the interparticle gap as well as particles geometry and plasmonic resonances supported by individual particles. A larger redshift is usually associated with smaller interparticle gap and larger cluster size.

Plasmon coupling can also cause the electric field in the interparticle gap to be boosted by several orders of magnitude, which far-exceeds the field enhancement for a single plasmonic nanoparticle. Many sensing applications such as surface enhanced Raman spectroscopy (SERS) utilize the plasmon coupling between nanoparticles to achieve ultralow detection limit.

== Plasmon ruler ==
Plasmon ruler refers to a dimer of two identical plasmonic nanospheres linked together through a polymer, typically DNA or RNA. Based on the Universal Scaling Law between spectral shift and the interparticle separations, the nanometer scale distance can be monitored by the color shifts of dimer resonance peak. Plasmon rulers are typically used to monitor distance fluctuation below the diffraction limit, between tens of nanometers and a few nanometers.

== Plasmon coupling microscopy ==
Plasmon coupling microscopy is a ratiometric widefield imaging approach that allows monitoring of multiple plasmon rulers with high temporal resolution. The entire field of view is imaged simultaneously on two wavelength channels, which corresponds to the red and blue flank of the plasmon ruler resonance. The spectral information of an individual plasmon ruler is expressed in the intensity distribution on the two monitored channels, quantified as R=(I_{1}-I_{2})/(I_{1}+I_{2}). Each R value corresponds to a certain nanometer scale distance which can be calculated using computer simulation or generated from experiments.
