= Wulffite =

General
- Category: Sulfate
- Formula: K_{3}NaCu_{4}O_{2}(SO_{4})_{4}
- IMA symbol: Wlf
- Crystal system: Orthorhombic
- Crystal class: mm2 – Pyramidal
- Space group: Pn2_{1}a (no. 33)
- Unit cell: a = 14.2810 Å, b = 4.9478 Å c = 24.1127 Å; β= 106.24°; Z = 4

Identification
- Formula mass: 810.69
- Color: Dark green, emerald green, blueish-dark green
- Crystal habit: Coarse rismatic crystals
- Cleavage: Perfect along {100} and good along {010}
- Fracture: stepped
- Tenacity: Clusters and crusts
- Mohs scale hardness: 2.5
- Luster: Vitreous
- Streak: light green
- Diaphaneity: Transparent
- Density: 3.23 g/cm^{3}
- Optical properties: Biaxial positive
- Refractive index: n_{α} = 1.582 n_{β} = 1.610 n_{γ} = 1.715
- Birefringence: δ = 0.133
- Pleochroism: strong
- Absorption spectra: 6.27 mm^{−1}
- Solubility: Yes

Wulffite is an alkali copper sulfate mineral with the chemical formula K_{3}NaCu_{4}O_{2}(SO_{4})_{4}, in the sulfate category of minerals. It was recently discovered in Kamchatka, Russia at the Tolbachik volcano in 2012. It was named for Russian crystallographer Georgiy Viktorovich Wulff, a renowned expert who furthered X-ray diffraction and interference. Wullfite shares many properties with parawulffite, which was found in the same area just with slightly different chemical composition.

== Occurrence ==
Wulffite is a volcanic, or fumarolic, mineral which forms in or near volcanic activity. It has been recorded as associated with hematite, langbeinite, calciolangbeinite, arcanite, krasheninnikovite, lammerite, labberite-β, johillerite, bradaczekite, urusovite, fluoborite, gahnite, orthoclase, and fluorophlogopite. Wulffite has been found to reside about a meter down in between layers of basalt scoria and small 2-inch volcanic plutons, otherwise known as volcanic bombs, where most of the common chemicals are sulfates, arsenate, and oxides. Wulffite was found in abundance at the active monogenetic volcanic Arsenatnaya fumarole where the temperature ranged from 360–380 °C where wulffite was found to mainly form, but with other nearby fumaroles reaching temperatures up to 430 °C. The fumarole also showed through analysis that atmospheric air interacts with the fumarole, enriching it in H_{2}O, HF, HCl, SO_{2}, CO_{2}. The Tolbachik volcano in Russia at 55º41´N 160º14´E, at an elevation of 1200 meters, is so far the only place to have wulffite occurring.

== Physical properties ==
Wulffite is an exhalation mineral with brittle, clear crystals and a Mohs hardness of 2.5. They form individually or in coarse clusters and crusts of elongated prismatic crystals reaching a maximum size of 2 mm long and 1.2 mm thick with groups of clusters stretching 1 cm across. Wulffite has two directions of perfect cleavage parallel to the positive elongation and another on the (010) direction. It also tends to fracture in a steeped pattern. The crystal colors take on being a dark emerald green to a bluish tinted green, dark green being the most common. The mineral has also shown strong optical phenomenon of pleochroism that absorbs light and changes the color from emerald green to pale green (Z dark emerald green > Y green > X pale green). All of the physical properties of wulffite can be contributed to the highly volcanic environment in which they formed and the amount of elements available for it to form at all.

== Chemical and optical properties ==
Wulffite is specific sulfate labeled under alkali copper sulfates with its empirical formula calculated from 18 oxygen to be Na_{l.08}(K_{2.85}Rb_{0.08}Cs_{0.04})_{Σ2.97}(Cu_{3.99}Zn_{0.02})_{Σ4.01}S_{3.99}O_{18}. Wulffite has also been shown to dissolve in water showing that its bonds are weak enough to dissolve in room temperature water. Many forms of X-ray analysis were performed, such as X-ray powder diffraction, single crystal diffraction and Jeol JSM-6480LV, a scanning electron microscope, to find the chemical composition and crystal structure to compile the data of the new mineral. The analysis showed that wulffite has an orthorhombic crystal system structure with a basic unit of a heteropolyhedral quasi-framework formed from Cu-O-S chains.

== Chemical composition ==
Oxide	wt%	Range
Na_{2}O	4.11	3.76–4.29
K_{2}O	16.46	15.82–17.22
Rb_{2}O	0.95	0.64–1.16
Cs_{2}O	0.65	0.00–1.05
CuO	38.88	37.96–40.02
ZnO	0.15	0.00–0.39
SO_{3}	39.11	38.64–40.15
Total	100.31	98.63–100.31

== X-ray crystallography ==
From chemical and optical properties, the tests also showed how the chains run along the [010] with a center of copper pyramids and SO_{4} tetrahedra. Wulffite can also be distinguished from the similar parawulffite by its difference in Cu-O-S chain structures, since wulffite is mainly centered around the SO_{4} tetrahedra and with the chains being interconnected instead of distorted. Wulffite was also discovered to be lacking in common bands of BO_{3}, CO_{3}, NO_{3}, and hydrogen groups. With the distinctive chemical banding missing and the specific environment in which they form, making wulffite a good index mineral.

== See also ==
List of Minerals
