= Georg Wulff =

Russian crystallographer (1863–1925)

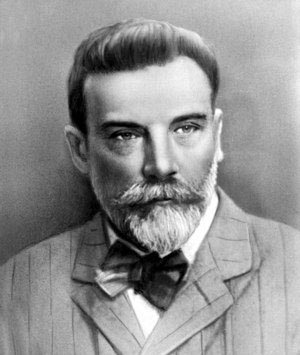
Wulff in 1912

Georg Wulff, Georgy Wulff or Yuri Viktorovich Vulf (Russian: Георгий (Юрий) Викторович Вульф; 22 June [O.S. 10 June] 1863 – 25 December 1925) was a pioneer Russian crystallographer.

== Biography ==
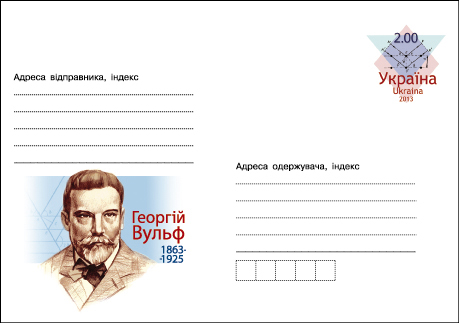
Ukrainian envelope commemorating the 150th birth anniversary of George Wulff

Wulff was born in Nizhyn, Chernigov Governorate, in the Russian Empire (now in Ukraine), where his mother Lydia was daughter of teacher E. V. Gudim. His father Viktor Konstantinovich Vulf was a literature teacher at the 6th Warsaw Gymnasium. He grew up in Warsaw and graduated from the 6th Warsaw Gymnasium in 1880. He then went to the Imperial Warsaw University to study natural sciences. He studied under crystallographer A. E. Lagorio, and physicists N. G. Egorov and P. A. Zilov. In the third year, he studied the electrical properties of quartz for which he received a gold medal. In his fourth year he was assisting lectures of professor Zilov. He began to study the relationship of crystal structure and optical properties and in 1888 he published a paper on the "theory of rotatory polarization". He then went to St. Petersburg University working with E.S. Fedorov. In 1889 he went to Munich to study with Paul Heinrich von Groth. He also attended classes by Leonard Zonke. He also went to Paris and studied under Marie Alfred Cornu. While in Paris he married Vera Vasilyevna Yakunchikova. He returned to Warsaw to defend his master's thesis in 1892 on pseudosymmetric crystals. He then became a privatdozent at Warsaw University and lectured on mineralogy and crystallography. In 1897 he joined the Imperial Kazan University but returned to Warsaw in 1899. In 1907 he was invited to Moscow University by V. I. Vernadsky. He taught crystallography also at the Shanyavsky Moscow City People's University. He also collaborated with P. N. Lebedev. In 1911 he left Moscow University along with other professors in protest of Lev Casso. During World War I, Wulff helped develop new X-ray equipment. In 1917 he was restored to Moscow University and from 1922 he headed the Institute of Physics and Crystallography.

== Scientific contributions ==
Wulff studied crystal growth processes and modified Curie's principle on the minimization of surface energy. Now called the Gibbs-Curie-Wulff principle it states that the growth rate of the faces of a crystal are proportional to the specific surface energies of the faces. This is further extended by his idea of Wulff vectors and the Wulff construction. He also introduced a stereoscoping projection method using what is called the Wulff net. Wulff was one of the first to experiment with X-ray crystallography. He developed a relationship in X-ray diffraction (nλ = 2d sin θ) which was also found independently by the Bragg father and son duo in 1913 and sometimes called the Bragg–Wulff equation. The mineral wulffite are named after him.
