= Walter L. Winterbottom =

Walter L. Winterbottom (1930-2013) was Pittsburgh-born material scientist who started his research career at the Metals Research Laboratory, Carnegie Institute of Technology (where he published with J.P. Hirth in 1962 ‘’ Diffusional contribution to the total flow from a Knudsen cell’’) and then worked for the rest of his research career at the Ford Motor Company's Scientific Research Lab in Dearborn, Michigan. He worked there from 1962 until retirement in 1995. His academic background included degrees from both Drexel Institute of Technology (Drexel University) (1958) and Carnegie Institute of Technology (Carnegie Mellon University) (1962) (Metallurgical Engineering - Dissertation: Some Considerations of Surface Phenomena).

It was at Ford that he published his most noted contribution (‘’Equilibrium shape of a small particle in contact with a foreign substrate’’) that led to the term the Winterbottom construction being used to describe the solution for the shape of a solid particle on a substrate, where the substrate is forced to remain flat.

== Selected works ==
- Winterbottom, W. L., & Hirth, J. P. (1962). Diffusional contribution to the total flow from a Knudsen cell. The Journal of Chemical Physics, 37(4), 784-793.
- Winterbottom, W. L. (1967). Equilibrium shape of a small particle in contact with a foreign substrate. Acta Metallurgica, 15(2), 303-310.
- Winterbottom, W. L. (1973). Application of thermal desorption methods in studies of catalysis: I. Chemisorption of carbon monoxide on platinum. Surface Science, 36(1), 195-204.
- Ku, R. C., & Winterbottom, W. L. (1985). Electrical conductivity in sputter-deposited chromium oxide coatings. Thin Solid Films, 127(3-4), 241-256.
- Winterbottom, W. L. (1993). Converting to lead-free solders: An automotive industry perspective. JOM, 45(7), 20-24.
