= Plasmonic nanoparticle =

FDTD simulation of a pulsed plane wave interaction with plasmonic nanoparticles

Plasmonic nanoparticles are particles whose electron density can couple with electromagnetic radiation of wavelengths that are far larger than the particle due to the nature of the dielectric-metal interface between the medium and the particles: unlike in a pure metal where there is a maximum limit on what size wavelength can be effectively coupled based on the material size.

What differentiates these particles from normal surface plasmons is that plasmonic nanoparticles also exhibit interesting scattering, absorbance, and coupling properties based on their geometries and relative positions. These unique properties have made them a focus of research in many applications including solar cells, spectroscopy, signal enhancement for imaging, and cancer treatment. Their high sensitivity also identifies them as good candidates for designing mechano-optical instrumentation.

Plasmons are the oscillations of free electrons that are the consequence of the formation of a dipole in the material due to electromagnetic waves. The electrons migrate in the material to restore its initial state; however, the light waves oscillate, leading to a constant shift in the dipole that forces the electrons to oscillate at the same frequency as the light. This coupling only occurs when the frequency of the light is equal to or less than the plasma frequency and is greatest at the plasma frequency that is therefore called the resonant frequency. The scattering and absorbance cross-sections describe the intensity of a given frequency to be scattered or absorbed. Many fabrication processes or chemical synthesis methods exist for preparation of such nanoparticles, depending on the desired size and geometry.

The nanoparticles can form clusters (the so-called "plasmonic molecules") and interact with each other to form cluster states. The symmetry of the nanoparticles and the distribution of the electrons within them can affect a type of bonding or antibonding character between the nanoparticles similarly to molecular orbitals. Since light couples with the electrons, polarized light can be used to control the distribution of the electrons and alter the mulliken term symbol for the irreducible representation. Changing the geometry of the nanoparticles can be used to manipulate the optical activity and properties of the system, but so can the polarized light by lowering the symmetry of the conductive electrons inside the particles and changing the dipole moment of the cluster. These clusters can be used to manipulate light on the nano scale.

== Theory ==
The quasistatic equations that describe the scattering and absorbance cross-sections for very small spherical nanoparticles are:

${{\sigma }_{\rm scatt}}=\frac{8\pi }{3}{{k}^{4}}{{R}^{6}}{{\left| \frac{{{\varepsilon }_{\rm particle}}-{{\varepsilon }_{\rm medium}}}{{{\varepsilon }_{\rm particle}}+2{{\varepsilon }_{\rm medium}}} \right|}^{2}}$

${{\sigma }_{\rm abs}}=4\pi k{{R}^{3}}\operatorname{Im}\left| \frac{{{\varepsilon }_{\rm particle}}-{{\varepsilon }_{\rm medium}}}{{{\varepsilon }_{\rm particle}}+2{{\varepsilon }_{\rm medium}}} \right|$

where $k$ is the wavenumber of the electric field, $R$ is the radius of the particle, ${{\varepsilon }_{\rm medium}}$ is the relative permittivity of the dielectric medium and ${{\varepsilon }_{\rm particle}}$ is the relative permittivity of the nanoparticle defined by

${{\varepsilon }_{\rm particle}}=1-\frac{\omega _{\rm p}^{2}}{{{\omega }^{2}} + \mathrm{i}{\omega}{\gamma}}$

also known as the Drude Model for free electrons where ${{\omega }_{\rm p}}$ is the plasma frequency, ${\gamma}$ is the relaxation frequency of the charge carries, and $\omega$ is the frequency of the electromagnetic radiation. This equation is the result of solving the differential equation for a harmonic oscillator with a driving force proportional to the electric field that the particle is subjected to. For a more thorough derivation, see surface plasmon.

It logically follows that the resonance conditions for these equations is reached when the denominator is around zero such that

${{\varepsilon }_{\rm particle}}+2{{\varepsilon }_{\rm medium}}\approx 0$

When this condition is fulfilled the cross-sections are at their maximum.

These cross-sections are for single, spherical particles. The equations change when particles are non-spherical, or are coupled to 1 or more other nanoparticles, such as when their geometry changes. This principle is important for several applications.

Rigorous electrodynamic analysis of plasma oscillations in a spherical metal nanoparticle of a finite size was performed in.

== Noble metal plasmonic nanoparticles ==
Plasmonic nanoparticles are most commonly synthesized from noble metals, particularly gold (Au), silver (Ag), and copper (Cu). These metals possess a high density of free electrons, allowing for strong localized surface plasmon resonance (LSPR) in the visible and near-infrared (NIR) regions of the electromagnetic spectrum.

=== Gold Nanoparticles (Au) ===
Gold is the most widely used plasmonic metal in biomedical applications owing to its superior chemical stability and biocompatibility. While its LSPR intensity is lower than silver's, its surface chemistry (e.g., thiol-gold bonding) is well-defined for functionalization.

=== Silver Nanoparticles (Ag) ===
Silver is often considered the most efficient plasmonic material for visible light applications due to its relatively low damping losses. This results in the narrowest and most intense LSPR peaks among noble metals, though it could be easily oxidized and sulfided.

=== Copper Nanoparticles (Cu) ===
Copper exhibits plasmonic properties similar to gold but is significantly more abundant and cost effective. However, its rapid oxidation under ambient conditions hinders its applications, requiring further protective layer (e.g., shell) or inert environment to maintain its plasmonic function.

== Applications ==
=== Plasmonic solar cells ===
Due to their ability to scatter light back into the photovoltaic structure and low absorption, plasmonic nanoparticles are under investigation as a method for increasing solar cell efficiency. Forcing more light to be absorbed by the dielectric increases efficiency.

Plasmons can be excited by optical radiation and induce an electric current from hot electrons in materials fabricated from gold particles and light-sensitive molecules of porphin, of precise sizes and specific patterns. The wavelength to which the plasmon responds is a function of the size and spacing of the particles. The material is fabricated using ferroelectric nanolithography. Compared to conventional photoexcitation, the material produced three to 10 times the current.

=== Spectroscopy ===
In the past 5 years plasmonic nanoparticles have been explored as a method for high resolution spectroscopy. One group utilized 40 nm gold nanoparticles that had been functionalized such that they would bind specifically to epidermal growth factor receptors to determine the density of those receptors on a cell. This technique relies on the fact that the effective geometry of the particles change when they appear within one particle diameter (40 nm) of each other. Within that range, quantitative information on the EGFR density in the cell membrane can be retrieved based on the shift in resonant frequency of the plasmonic particles.

=== Cancer treatment ===
Plasmonic nanoparticles have demonstrated a wide potential for the establishment of innovative cancer treatments. Despite that, there are still not plasmonic nanomaterials employed in the clinical practice, because the associated metal persistence. Preliminary research indicates that some nanomaterials, among which gold nanorods and ultrasmall-in-nano architectures, can convert IR laser light into localized heat, also in combination with other established cancer treatments.

== See also ==
- Localized surface plasmon
- Plasmonic metamaterials
