= Wulff construction =

Lowest energy shape of a single crystal

Wulff construction. The surface free energy $\gamma$, or the gamma plot, is shown in red, and the normals to lines from the origin to $\gamma$ are dark blue. The inner envelope is the resulting Wulff shape, shown in blue.

The Wulff construction is a method to determine the equilibrium shape of a droplet or crystal of fixed volume inside a separate phase (usually its saturated solution or vapor). Energy minimization arguments are used to show that certain crystal planes are preferred over others, giving the crystal its shape. It is of fundamental importance in a number of areas ranging from the shape of nanoparticles and precipitates to nucleation. It also has more applied relevance in areas such as the shapes of active particles in heterogeneous catalysis.

== Theory ==
In 1878 Josiah Willard Gibbs proposed that a droplet or crystal will arrange itself such that its surface Gibbs free energy is minimized by assuming a shape of low surface energy. He defined the quantity

$$\Delta G_i= \sum_{j}\gamma_j O_j~$$

Here $\gamma _j$ represents the surface (Gibbs free) energy per unit area of the $j$th crystal face and $O_j$ is the area of said face. $\Delta G_i$ represents the difference in energy between a real crystal composed of $i$ molecules with a surface and a similar configuration of $i$ molecules located inside an infinitely large crystal. This quantity is therefore the energy associated with the surface. The equilibrium shape of the crystal will then be that which minimizes the value of $\Delta G_i$.

In 1901 Russian scientist George Wulff stated (without proof) that the length of a vector drawn normal to a crystal face $h_j$ will be proportional to its surface energy $\gamma_j$: $h_j=\lambda \gamma_j$. The vector $h_j$ is the "height" of the $j$th face, drawn from the center of the crystal to the face; for a spherical crystal this is simply the radius. This is known as the Gibbs-Wulff theorem.

In 1943 Laue gave a simple proof, with a more complete version given shortly after by Dinghas. The method was extended to include curved surfaces in 1953 by Herring with a different proof of the theorem which has been generalized with existence proofs by others such as the work of Johnson and Chakerian. Herring gave a method for determining the equilibrium shape of a crystal, consisting of two main exercises. To begin, a polar plot of surface energy as a function of orientation is made. This is known as the gamma plot and is usually denoted as $\gamma(\hat{n})$, where $\hat{n}$ denotes the surface normal, e.g., a particular crystal face. The second part is the Wulff construction itself in which the gamma plot is used to determine graphically which crystal faces will be present. It can be determined graphically by drawing lines from the origin to every point on the gamma plot. A plane perpendicular to the normal $\hat{n}$ is drawn at each point where it intersects the gamma plot. The inner envelope of these planes forms the equilibrium shape of the crystal.

The Wulff construction is for the equilibrium shape, but there is a corresponding form called the "kinetic Wulff construction" where the surface energy is replaced by a growth velocity. There are also variants that can be used for particles on surfaces and with twin boundaries.

== Proof ==
Various proofs of the theorem have been given by Hilton, Liebman, Laue, Herring, and a rather extensive treatment by Cerf. The following is after the method of R. F. Strickland-Constable. We begin with the surface energy for a crystal

$$\Delta G_{i}= \sum_{j}\gamma_j O_j \,\!$$

which is the product of the surface energy per unit area times the area of each face, summed over all faces. This is minimized for a given volume when

$$\delta \left(\sum_{j}\gamma_j O_j\right)_{V_c} = \sum_{j}\gamma_j \delta (O_j)_{V_c} = 0\,\!$$

Surface free energy, being an intensive property, does not vary with volume. We then consider a small change in shape for a constant volume. If a crystal were nucleated to a thermodynamically unstable state, then the change it would undergo afterward to approach an equilibrium shape would be under the condition of constant volume. By definition of holding a variable constant, the change must be zero, $\delta (V_c)_{V_c} = 0$. Then by expanding $V_c$ in terms of the surface areas $O_j$ and heights $h_j$ of the crystal faces, one obtains

$$\delta (V_c)_{V_c} =\frac{1}{3} \delta \left(\sum_{j} h_j O_j\right)_{V_c} = 0$$,

which can be written, by applying the product rule, as

$$\sum_{j}h_j \delta (O_j)_{V_c} + \sum_{j}O_j\delta (h_j)_{V_c}= 0 \,\!$$.

The second term must be zero, that is,

$O_1 \delta (h_1)_{V_c} + O_2 \delta (h_2)_{V_c} + \ldots = 0$

This is because, if the volume is to remain constant, the changes in the heights of the various faces must be such that when multiplied by their surface areas the sum is zero. If there were only two surfaces with appreciable area, as in a pancake-like crystal, then $O_1/O_2 = -\delta(h_1)_{V_c}/\delta (h_2)_{V_c}$. In the pancake instance, $O_1 = O_2$ on premise. Then by the condition, $\delta(h_1)_{V_c} = - \delta(h_2)_{V_c}$. This is in agreement with a simple geometric argument considering the pancake to be a cylinder with very small aspect ratio. The general result is taken here without proof. This result imposes that the remaining sum also equal 0,

$$\sum_{j}h_j \delta (O_j)_{V_c} = 0 \,\!$$

Again, the surface energy minimization condition is that

$$\sum_{j}\gamma_j \delta (O_j)_{V_c} = 0\,\!$$

These may be combined, employing a constant of proportionality $\lambda$ for generality, to yield

$$\sum_{j}(h_i - \lambda \gamma_j) \delta (O_j)_{V_c} = 0\,\!$$

The change in shape $\delta (O_j)_{V_c}$ must be allowed to be arbitrary, which then requires that $h_j=\lambda \gamma_j$, which then proves the Gibbs-Wulff Theorem.

== See also ==
- Extended Wulff constructions - variants with twins and for kinetic control
