= Indigo =

Indigo most often refers to:

- Indigo (color), a color between blue and violet
- Indigo dye, an organic compound with a distinctive blue color

Indigo or INDIGO may also refer to:

== Companies ==
- IndiGo, an airline based in India
- Indigo Airlines (American airline), an American airline
- Indigo (restaurant), a restaurant in Mumbai, India
- Canal Indigo, a pay-per-view TV network
- Hotel Indigo, a hotel chain
- Indigo Agriculture, a startup company that uses plant microbiomes to strengthen crops
- INDIGO Beijing, a shopping centre in China
- Indigo Books and Music (stylised !ndigo), a Canadian bookstore chain
- Indigo Film, an Italian film production company
- Indigo Internet, an internet service provider
- Indigo Park Services UK Limited, a parking company
- Indigo Partners, a private equity firm
- Indigo Records, a record label
- Indego, a public bike sharing system in Philadelphia, Pennsylvania
- IndyGo, a public bus agency in Indianapolis, Indiana

== Film ==
- Indigo (film), a 2003 film by Stephen Simon
- Indigo, a character in Rainbow Brite and the Star Stealer

== Literature ==
- Indigo (Hoffman novel), a 2002 novel by Alice Hoffman
- Indigo (Warner novel), a 1992 novel by Marina Warner
- Indigo (comics), a DC Comics character
- Indigo Digital Press, a series of printing presses
- Indigo Publications, publishes websites and newsletters
- Indigo, a novel by Graham Joyce
- Indigo, series of fantasy novels by Louise Cooper
- Indigo, an imprint of Orion Publishing Group catering for the teen market

== Music ==
- The Indigo, a Japanese band

=== Albums ===
- Indigo (Matt Bianco album), 1988
- Indigo (Chris Brown album), 2019
- Indigo (Diego Gonzalez album), 2008
- Indigo (Maja Keuc album), 2011
- Indigo (Never Shout Never album), 2012
- Indigo (RM album), 2022
- Indigo (Wild Nothing album), 2018
- Indigo: Women of Song, a 2004 album by Olivia Newton-John
- Indigo, a 1991 album by Patrick O'Hearn
- Indigo, a 2018 album by Kandace Springs

=== Songs ===
- "Indigo" (Chris Brown song), 2019
- "Indigo" (Justhis, Kid Milli, Noel, and Yang Hong-won song), 2018
- "Indigo" (Peter Gabriel song), 1978
- "Indigo" (Sam Barber song), 2024
- "Indigo", a 2016 song by Almah from E.V.O
- "Indigo", a 2007 song by Epica from The Divine Conspiracy
- "Indigo", a 2016 song by Invent Animate from Stillworld
- "Indigo", a 2025 song by MGK from Lost Americana
- "Indigo", a 2000 song by Moloko from Things to Make and Do
- "Indigo", a song by Niki from Head in the Clouds II
- "Indigo", a 2023 song by Of Mice & Men from Tether
- "Indigo", a 2025 song by Rachel Chinouriri from Little House
- Indigo, a 2016 opera by Eicca Toppinen and Perttu Kivilaakso

== Natural ==
- Indigo bush
- Indigo dye, an organic compound with a distinctive blue color
  - Indigofera, a genus of flowering plants used to produce indigo dye
    - Indigofera tinctoria, a.k.a. 'true indigo', the species most often used in production of indigo dye
  - Persicaria tinctoria, a.k.a. 'Japanese' or 'Chinese indigo', an alternative source of indigo dye
  - Strobilanthes cusia, a.k.a. 'Assam indigo', historically cultivated as a source of indigo dye
- Indigo snake Drymarchon, a genus of large nonvenomous snakes
- Wild indigo, a herbaceous perennial plant
- Indigo bunting, a small seed-eating bird in the cardinal family

== Places ==
- Indigo Valley, Victoria, Australia
- Shire of Indigo, Victoria, Australia
- Indigo Lake, Alaska
- Indigo Tunnel, an abandoned railroad tunnel in Maryland
- Indigo Lake, Ohio

== Radio stations ==
- Indigo 91.9 FM, an Indian radio station
- Indigo FM (Australia), an Australian radio station
- Indigo FM, a radio station broadcasting to the South Lakes and North Lancashire area in the United Kingdom

== Technology ==
- Indigo (messaging system), part of the Windows .NET software framework
- Indigo (virtual assistant), an intelligent personal assistant for mobile devices
- Indian Initiative in Gravitational-wave Observations (INDIGO), a proposed gravitational wave detector
- Project Indigo, Indian/Swiss attempt to develop an intermediate-range surface-to-air missile
- SGI Indigo, a line of workstation computers
- Indigo (submarine cable system), connecting Sydney, Perth, Indonesia and Singapore
- Indigo, a postpaid cellular service by Mobilink in Pakistan
- Indigo, a release of Eclipse

== Transport ==
- IndiGo, a low-cost Indian airline
- Indigo Airlines (American airline), a defunct airline
- Ford Indigo, a concept car by Ford Motor Company
- Indigo 3000, a Swedish roadster
- Tata Indigo, an Indian compact car
- Indego, a public bike sharing system in Philadelphia, Pennsylvania
- IndyGo, a public bus agency in Indianapolis, Indiana

== Other uses ==
- Indigo (actress) (born 1984), American television and voice actress
- Indigo (board game)
- Indiana County Transit Authority (IndiGO)
- Indigo children, a New Age concept, children who are believed to possess special traits or abilities
- Indigo Era, an economics theory
- Indigo (given name), the given name

== See also ==
- Captain Indigo, a character in the television series Captain Scarlet and the Mysterons
- Indiggo, a Romanian-American singing duo
- Indigo carmine, a pH indicator and food colorant
- Indigo Girls, American folk rock band
- Indigo Lake (disambiguation)
- Indigo revolt, a Bengali peasant movement
- Indigo Tribe, a fictional organization in DC Comics
- Indigo Walker, a character in the television series Home and Away
- Endigo, Swedish-Japanese drag queen
