= Indigo Airlines =

Indigo Airlines may refer to:

- Indigo Airlines (American airline)
- IndiGo, Indian airline
