= Indigo Lake =

Indigo Lake may refer to:

- Indigo Lake, Alaska
- Indigo Lake, Ohio
