= Inex (disambiguation) =

Inex is an eclipse cycle.

Inex or INEX may refer to:

- Inex Pharmaceuticals
- Inex Adria Airways
- Internet Neutral Exchange, Ireland
- The Legends car racing rules body
