= Gerd Ulrich Nienhaus =

German physicist

- Education: University of Münster
- Scientific career
- Workplaces: Karlsruhe Institute of Technology; University of Ulm; University of Illinois at Urbana-Champaign; University of Mainz; University of Münster
- Thesis: Investigation of protein structure and dynamics: x-ray and γ-ray scattering with spatially sensitive proportional counters (translated from German) (1987)
- Website: Nienhaus Group

Gerd Ulrich "Uli" Nienhaus (born 1959) is a German physicist who is a professor and director of the Institute of Applied Physics, Karlsruhe Institute of Technology (KIT). At the KIT, he is also affiliated with the Institute of Nanotechnology, Institute of Biological and Chemical Systems, and Institute of Physical Chemistry, and he is an adjunct professor at the University of Illinois at Urbana-Champaign.

He is known for his research on the molecular machinery of life. Over the years, he has employed and advanced a wide range of biophysical techniques, including protein crystallography with x-rays and γ-rays, various spectroscopic methods (Mössbauer, XAS, UV-VIS, infrared) and optical fluorescence spectroscopy and microscopy (single-molecule studies, FRET, FLIM, super-resolution microscopy) to elucidate the structure, dynamics and function of biological molecules. He has also been engaged in the development and characterization of nanoscale luminescent markers for bioimaging (fluorescent proteins, gold nanoclusters, semiconductor quantum dots). This research has been documented in more than 500 publications.

== Education and early career ==
Nienhaus studied Physics and Physical Chemistry at the University of Münster, where he received his Diploma in Physics in 1983. In 1988, he earned his PhD in Physical Chemistry with a dissertation entitled (translated from German) "Investigation of protein structure and dynamics: x-ray and γ-ray scattering with spatially sensitive proportional counters". For this research in Fritz Parak's laboratory, he developed large multi-wire proportional counters with spherical drift chambers, which had high long-term stability to enable collection of x-ray and γ-ray crystal diffraction data over many weeks.

After brief postdoctoral stints at the Universities of Münster and Mainz, working on Mössbauer absorption spectroscopy with extremely wide energy windows, Nienhaus moved to the Physics Department of the University of Illinois at Urbana-Champaign in early 1990 as a Feodor Lynen Fellow of the Alexander von Humboldt Foundation. There, he joined the laboratory of Hans Frauenfelder to pursue time-resolved UV-VIS and infrared studies of ligand binding and protein dynamics.

== Research and career ==
At the University of Illinois, Nienhaus was promoted to research assistant professor (1991), assistant professor of physics (1992) and biophysics (1993) and associate professor with tenure (1996). In this period, his laboratory carried on with studies of ligand binding and protein dynamics, mainly on heme proteins. Since 1997, he has been appointed as an adjunct professor.

In 1996, he accepted an offer to become head and professor of the Department of Biophysics, University of Ulm. There, he continued his research on heme proteins, studying ligand migration within these proteins and its effects on the ligand binding function. He further expanded his portfolio of biophysical methods to include fluorescence correlation spectroscopy and single molecule fluorescence microscopy. In 1999, he took a sabbatical to study RNA dynamics with single molecule FRET in Steve Chu's laboratory at Stanford University. In Ulm, together with Jörg Wiedenmann, he began to characterize and further develop novel members of the green fluorescent protein family, including EosFP, IrisFP, eqFP611, and mRuby.

In 2009, Nienhaus joined the University of Karlsruhe (TH), which soon thereafter was incorporated into the Karlsruhe Institute of Technology (KIT), as a professor and director of the Institute of Applied Physics. There, he and his collaborators have established a strong research focus on the advancement of optical fluorescence microscopy methods for super-resolution imaging (stimulated emission depletion (STED) nanoscopy, single-molecule localization microscopy) and light-sheet microscopy, and their application to various biological problems. An important research area has been the study of the emission properties of nanoparticles as luminescence markers and their interactions with the biological environment. In collaboration with Andres Jäschke's lab at the University of Heidelberg, single-molecule studies have been performed to study RNA dynamics, and RNA aptamers for super-resolution imaging have been developed and characterized.

== Honors ==
- 1990 Feodor Lynen Fellow, Alexander von Humboldt Foundation.
- 1994 Fellow in the Center for Advanced Study, University of Illinois.
- 1998 Fellow of the American Physical Society (APS).
- 2001 Fellow of the Institute of Physics (IOP, London).
- 2003 Fellow of the American Association for the Advancement of Science (AAAS).
- 2021 Werner Heisenberg Medal of the Alexander von Humboldt Foundation.
- 2023 Fellow of the Biophysical Society.
