= Rahul Akerkar =

Indian chef and restaurateur

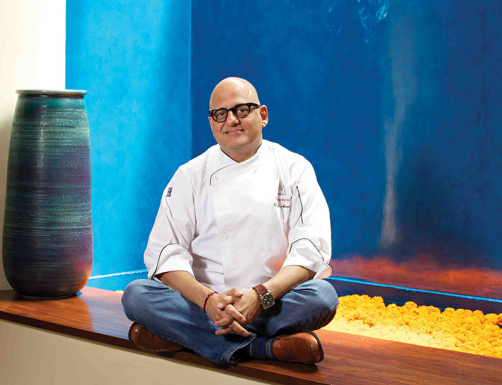
- Born: Mumbai, India
- Education: The Doon School; Franklin & Marshall College; Columbia University
- Occupations: Chef, restaurateur
- Known for: Indigo, Qualia
- Spouse: Malini Akerkar
- Children: 2

Rahul Akerkar is an Indian chef, restaurateur and the founder of Indigo, a Mumbai restaurant credited with introducing the concept of European fine-dining in the city, when it opened in 1999. In the 1990s nascent Indian restaurant industry, Akerkar was among the first Indian chefs and restaurateurs, working outside the Indian five-star hotel industry, to introduce independent fine-dining restaurants in India and focus on carefully sourced ingredients and high quality service.

In April 2019, Akerkar opened his new restaurant, Qualia, in Lower Parel, Mumbai.

== Early life and education ==
Akerkar was born to a German-American mother and an Indian father in Mumbai. Akerkar went to the all-boys boarding school The Doon School in Dehradun. He went on to study Biology and Chemical Engineering at Franklin & Marshall College, followed by a master's in Biochemical Engineering at Columbia University. Throughout college in the United States, Akerkar worked in American kitchens in various capacities: dishwasher, server and chef. His sister is the renowned theater and television actress Avantika Akerkar.

== Career ==
He returned to India in 1989 and founded Just Desserts, a cafe-pub, with AD Singh and soon launched his standalone restaurant Under The Over. In 1996, Akerkar established deGustibus Hospitality, which ran Mumbai's first standalone restaurants Indigo, Tote, Neel and Moveable Feast. In 2007, Indigo became the first Indian restaurant to enter the World's Top 100 and entered Asia's Top 50 in 2013. In 1998, Akerkar left India for the United States to study the global dining trends and returned in 1999 to open Indigo in Colaba, Mumbai. In 2015, Akerkar sold his stake in deGustibus Hospitality, the company he set up, citing differences in creative vision with the investors.

=== Indigo ===
In 1999, Akerkar opened the restaurant Indigo in a colonial bungalow in Mumbai's heritage district of Colaba, introducing European fine-dining in the city. With the success of Indigo, Akerkar launched a casual offshoot to the brand called Indigo Delicatessen. After his exit in 2015, Indigo has closed down its operations currently in Mumbai and Delhi.

=== Qualia ===
After exiting deGustibus in 2015, Akerkar undertook research in different countries for his new venture. In April 2019, he opened his new Mumbai restaurant Qualia (a Latin term meaning "essence of sensory experience". The restaurant opened to critical acclaim. The menu draws inspiration from both Indian and European traditions with a special focus on fermented ingredients.
