= Internet Neutral Exchange =

Internet exchange located in Ireland

Internet Neutral Exchange (INEX) is an Internet exchange located in Ireland, operating three VLANs at points of presence in Dublin at Equinix DB1 - Citywest, BT - Citywest, Equinix DB2 (Formerly Data Electronics) - Kilcarbery Park, Interxion DUB1 and DUB2 - Park West and Equinix DB3 - Northwest Business Park, Ballycoolin and a separate exchange, INEX Cork, at CIX in Cork.

The system provides a modern layer 2 ethernet switching network supporting IPv4 and IPv6 peerings on three VLANs, with supported access speeds of 1 Gbit/s, 10 Gbit/s and 100 Gbit/s. The membership of INEX includes most of the large/medium Internet service providers (ISPs) based in Ireland, a growing number of digital content providers, the Irish Government network, VoIP providers and mobile operators. There is an associate membership category for non-trafficking organisations that have an interest in networking within the Irish IP community.

Internet Neutral Exchange Association Company Limited by Guarantee is incorporated as a company limited by guarantee and is registered at the Companies Registration Office in Dublin, No. 253804. Each of its members is entitled to vote at general meetings. INEX maintains an executive board of 7 people, elected from its member representatives, and all board members must resign after two consecutive years service. Board members may be re-elected.

== History ==
Planning for INEX started in 1996 and it became operational in April 1997 with the backing of its four founding members; EUnet Ireland, HEAnet, Indigo and Telecom Internet with the objective of locally exchanging IP traffic between Irish-based ISPs, rather than using an external exchange or transit providers. As of October 2018, the Association had 103 full, 5 pro-bono, and 23 associate members.

In late 2019, a number of directors resigned over disagreements on the company's governance. A subsequent letter to members announced an outside consultant would be appointed to “undertake a root and branch review of Inex and its corporate structure”.

== See also ==
- Communications in Ireland
