= Colloidal gold =

Suspension of gold nanoparticles in a liquid

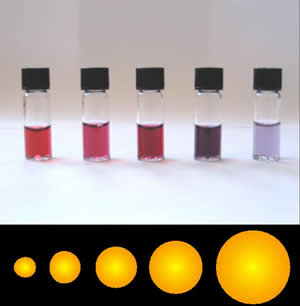
Gold Colloid of varying size Suspensions of gold nanoparticles of various sizes. The size difference causes the difference in colors.

Colloidal gold is a sol or colloidal suspension of nanoparticles of gold in a fluid, usually water. The colloid is coloured usually either wine red (for spherical particles less than 100 nm) or blue-purple (for larger spherical particles or nanorods). Due to their optical, electronic, and molecular-recognition properties, gold nanoparticles are the subject of substantial research, with many potential or promised applications in a wide variety of areas, including electron microscopy, electronics, nanotechnology, materials science, and biomedicine.

The properties of colloidal gold nanoparticles, and thus their potential applications, depend strongly upon their size and shape. For example, rodlike particles have both a transverse and longitudinal absorption peak, and anisotropy of the shape affects their self-assembly.

== History ==
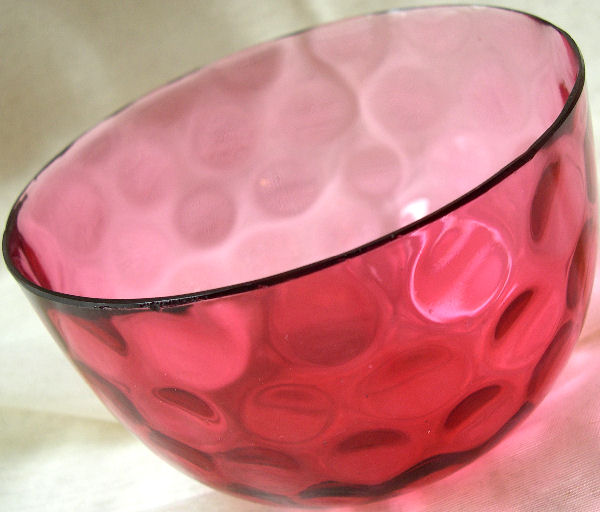
This cranberry glass bowl was made by adding a gold salt (probably gold chloride) to molten glass.

Used since ancient times as a method of staining glass, colloidal gold was used in the 4th-century Lycurgus Cup, which changes color depending on the location of light source.

During the Middle Ages, soluble gold, a solution containing gold salt, had a reputation for its curative property for various diseases. In 1618, Francis Anthony, a philosopher and member of the medical profession, published a book called Panacea Aurea, sive tractatus duo de ipsius Auro Potabili (Latin: gold potion, or two treatments of potable gold). The book introduces information on the formation of colloidal gold and its medical uses. About half a century later, English botanist Nicholas Culpepper published a book in 1656, Treatise of Aurum Potabile, solely discussing the medical uses of colloidal gold.

In 1676, Johann Kunckel, a German chemist, published a book on the manufacture of stained glass. In his book Valuable Observations or Remarks About the Fixed and Volatile Salts-Auro and Argento Potabile, Spiritu Mundi and the Like, Kunckel assumed that the pink color of Aurum Potabile came from small particles of metallic gold, not visible to human eyes. In 1842, John Herschel invented a photographic process called chrysotype (from the Greek χρῡσός meaning "gold") that used colloidal gold to record images on paper.

Modern scientific evaluation of colloidal gold did not begin until Michael Faraday's work in the 1850s. In 1856, in a basement laboratory of Royal Institution, Faraday accidentally created a ruby red solution while mounting pieces of gold leaf onto microscope slides. Since he was already interested in the properties of light and matter, Faraday further investigated the optical properties of the colloidal gold. He prepared the first pure sample of colloidal gold, which he called 'divided gold', in 1857. He used phosphorus to reduce a solution of gold chloride. The colloidal gold Faraday made 150 years ago is still optically active. For a long time, the composition of the 'ruby' gold was unclear. Several chemists suspected it to be a gold tin compound, due to its preparation. Faraday recognized that the color was actually due to the miniature size of the gold particles. He noted the light scattering properties of suspended gold microparticles, which is now called Faraday-Tyndall effect.

In 1898, Richard Adolf Zsigmondy prepared the first colloidal gold in diluted solution. Apart from Zsigmondy, Theodor Svedberg, who invented ultracentrifugation, and Gustav Mie, who provided the theory for scattering and absorption by spherical particles, were also interested in the synthesis and properties of colloidal gold.

With advances in various analytical technologies in the 20th century, studies on gold nanoparticles has accelerated. Advanced microscopy methods, such as atomic force microscopy and electron microscopy, have contributed the most to nanoparticle research. Due to their comparably easy synthesis and high stability, various gold particles have been studied for their practical uses. Different types of gold nanoparticle are already used in many industries.

== Physical properties ==
=== Optical ===
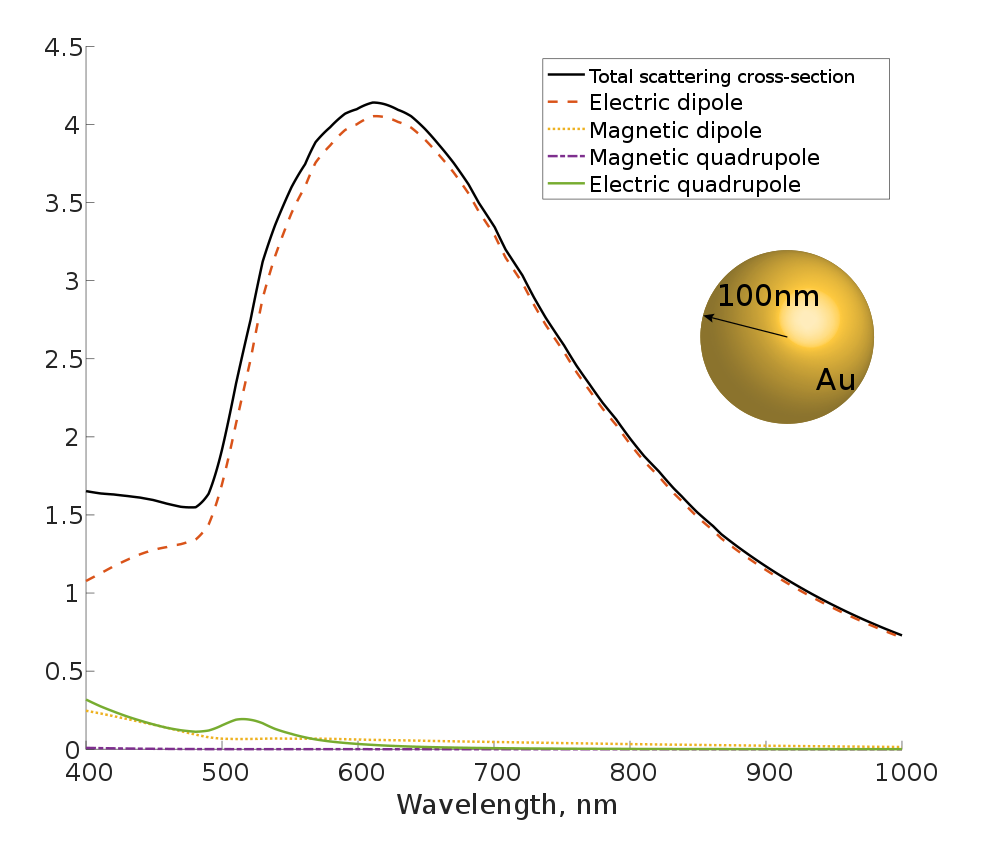
The variation of scattering cross section of 100 nm-radius gold nanoparticle vs. the wavelength

Colloidal gold has been used by artists for centuries because of the nanoparticle's interactions with visible light. Gold nanoparticles absorb and scatter light resulting in colours ranging from vibrant reds (smaller particles) to blues to black and finally to clear and colorless (larger particles), depending on particle size, shape, local refractive index, and aggregation state. These colors occur because of a phenomenon called localized surface plasmon resonance (LSPR), in which conduction electrons on the surface of the nanoparticle oscillate in resonance with incident light.

==== Effect of size, shape, composition and environment ====
As a general rule, the wavelength of light absorbed increases as a function of increasing nanoparticle size. Both the surface plasmon resonance frequency and scattering intensity depend on the size, shape composition and environment of the nanoparticles. This phenomenon may be quantified by use of the Mie scattering theory for spherical nanoparticles. Nanoparticles with diameters of 30–100 nm may be detected easily by a microscope, and particles with a size of 40 nm may even be detected by the naked eye when the concentration of the particles is 10^{−4} M or greater. The scattering from a 60 nm nanoparticle is about 10^{5} times stronger than the emission from a fluorescein molecule.

==== Effect of local refractive index ====
Changes in the apparent color of a gold nanoparticle solution can also be caused by the environment in which the colloidal gold is suspended. The optical properties of gold nanoparticles depend on the refractive index near the nanoparticle surface, so the molecules directly attached to the nanoparticle surface (i.e. nanoparticle ligands) and the nanoparticle solvent may both influence the observed optical features. As the refractive index near the gold surface increases, the LSPR shifts to longer wavelengths. In addition to solvent environment, the extinction peak can be tuned by coating the nanoparticles with non-conducting shells such as silica, biomolecules, or aluminium oxide.

==== Effect of aggregation ====
When gold nanoparticles aggregate, the optical properties of the particle change, because the effective particle size, shape, and dielectric environment all change.

== Medical research ==
=== Electron microscope labelling ===
Colloidal gold and various derivatives have long been among the most widely used labels for antigens in biological electron microscopy. Colloidal gold particles can be attached to many traditional biological probes such as antibodies, lectins, superantigens, glycans, nucleic acids, and receptors. Particles of different sizes are easily distinguishable in electron micrographs, allowing simultaneous multiple-labelling experiments.

In addition to biological probes, gold nanoparticles can be transferred to various mineral substrates, such as mica, single crystal silicon, and atomically flat gold(III), to be observed under atomic force microscopy (AFM).

=== Drug delivery system ===
Gold nanoparticles can be used to optimize the biodistribution of drugs to diseased organs, tissues or cells, in order to improve and target drug delivery. Nanoparticle-mediated drug delivery is feasible only if the drug distribution is otherwise inadequate. These cases include drug targeting of unstable (proteins, siRNA, DNA), delivery to the difficult sites (brain, retina, tumors, intracellular organelles) and drugs with serious side effects (e.g. anti-cancer agents). The performance of the nanoparticles depends on the size and surface functionalities in the particles. Also, the drug release and particle disintegration can vary depending on the system (e.g. biodegradable polymers sensitive to pH). An optimal nanodrug delivery system ensures that the active drug is available at the site of action for the correct time and duration, and their concentration should be above the minimal effective concentration (MEC) and below the minimal toxic concentration (MTC).

Gold nanoparticles are being investigated as carriers for drugs such as Paclitaxel. The administration of hydrophobic drugs require molecular encapsulation and it is found that nanosized particles are particularly efficient in evading the reticuloendothelial system.

=== Tumor detection ===
In cancer research, colloidal gold can be used to target tumors and provide detection using SERS (surface enhanced Raman spectroscopy) in vivo. These gold nanoparticles are surrounded with Raman reporters, which provide light emission that is over 200 times brighter than quantum dots. It was found that the Raman reporters were stabilized when the nanoparticles were encapsulated with a thiol-modified polyethylene glycol coat. This allows for compatibility and circulation in vivo. To specifically target tumor cells, the polyethylenegylated gold particles are conjugated with an antibody (or an antibody fragment such as scFv), against, e.g. epidermal growth factor receptor, which is sometimes overexpressed in cells of certain cancer types. Using SERS, these pegylated gold nanoparticles can then detect the location of the tumor.

Gold nanoparticles accumulate in tumors, due to the leakiness of tumor vasculature, and can be used as contrast agents for enhanced imaging in a time-resolved optical tomography system using short-pulse lasers for skin cancer detection in mouse model. It is found that intravenously administered spherical gold nanoparticles broadened the temporal profile of reflected optical signals and enhanced the contrast between surrounding normal tissue and tumors.

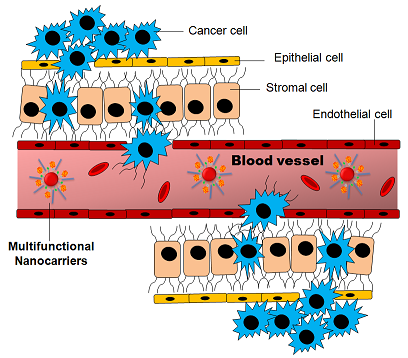
Tumor targeting via multifunctional nanocarriers. Cancer cells reduce adhesion to neighboring cells and migrate into the vasculature-rich stroma. Once at the vasculature, cells can freely enter the bloodstream. Once the tumor is directly connected to the main blood circulation system, multifunctional nanocarriers can interact directly with cancer cells and effectively target tumors.

=== Gene therapy ===
Gold nanoparticles have shown potential as intracellular delivery vehicles for siRNA oligonucleotides with maximal therapeutic impact.

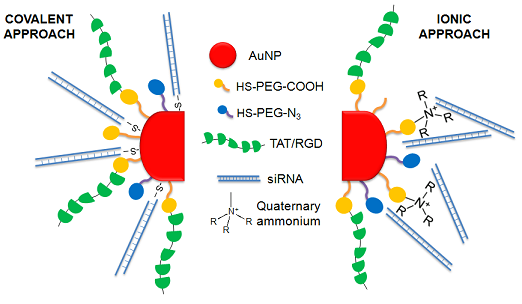
Multifunctional siRNA-gold nanoparticles with several biomolecules: PEG, cell penetration and cell adhesion peptides and siRNA. Two different approaches were employed to conjugate the siRNA to the gold nanoparticle: (1) Covalent approach: use of thiolated siRNA for gold-thiol binding to the nanoparticle; (2) Ionic approach: interaction of the negatively charged siRNA to the modified surface of the AuNP through ionic interactions.

Gold nanoparticles show potential as intracellular delivery vehicles for antisense oligonucleotides (single and double stranded DNA) by providing protection against intracellular nucleases and ease of functionalization for selective targeting.

=== Photothermal agents ===
Gold nanorods are being investigated as photothermal agents for in-vivo applications. Gold nanorods are rod-shaped gold nanoparticles whose aspect ratios tune the surface plasmon resonance (SPR) band from the visible to near-infrared wavelength. The total extinction of light at the SPR is made up of both absorption and scattering. For the smaller axial diameter nanorods (~10 nm), absorption dominates, whereas for the larger axial diameter nanorods (>35 nm) scattering can dominate. As a consequence, for in-vivo studies, small diameter gold nanorods are being used as photothermal converters of near-infrared light due to their high absorption cross-sections. Since near-infrared light transmits readily through human skin and tissue, these nanorods can be used as ablation components for cancer, and other targets. When coated with polymers, gold nanorods have been observed to circulate in-vivo with half-lives longer than 6 hours, bodily residence times around 72 hours, and little to no uptake in any internal organs except the liver.

Despite the unquestionable success of gold nanorods as photothermal agents in preclinical research, they have yet to obtain the approval for clinical use because the size is above the renal excretion threshold. In 2019, the first NIR-absorbing plasmonic ultrasmall-in-nano architecture has been reported, and jointly combine: (i) a suitable photothermal conversion for hyperthermia treatments, (ii) the possibility of multiple photothermal treatments and (iii) renal excretion of the building blocks after the therapeutic action.

=== Radiotherapy dose enhancer ===
Considerable interest has been shown in the use of gold and other heavy-atom-containing nanoparticles to enhance the dose delivered to tumors. Since the gold nanoparticles are taken up by the tumors more than the nearby healthy tissue, the dose is selectively enhanced. The biological effectiveness of this type of therapy seems to be due to the local deposition of the radiation dose near the nanoparticles. This mechanism is the same as occurs in heavy ion therapy.

=== Detection of toxic gas ===
Researchers have developed simple inexpensive methods for on-site detection of hydrogen sulfide H_{2}S present in air based on the antiaggregation of gold nanoparticles (AuNPs). Dissolving H_{2}S into a weak alkaline buffer solution leads to the formation of HS-, which can stabilize AuNPs and ensure they maintain their red color allowing for visual detection of toxic levels of H_{2}S.

=== Gold nanoparticle based biosensor ===
Gold nanoparticles are incorporated into biosensors to enhance its stability, sensitivity, and selectivity. Nanoparticle properties such as small size, high surface-to-volume ratio, and high surface energy allow immobilization of large range of biomolecules. Gold nanoparticle, in particular, could also act as "electron wire" to transport electrons and its amplification effect on electromagnetic light allows it to function as signal amplifiers. Main types of gold nanoparticle based biosensors are optical and electrochemical biosensor.

==== Optical biosensor ====
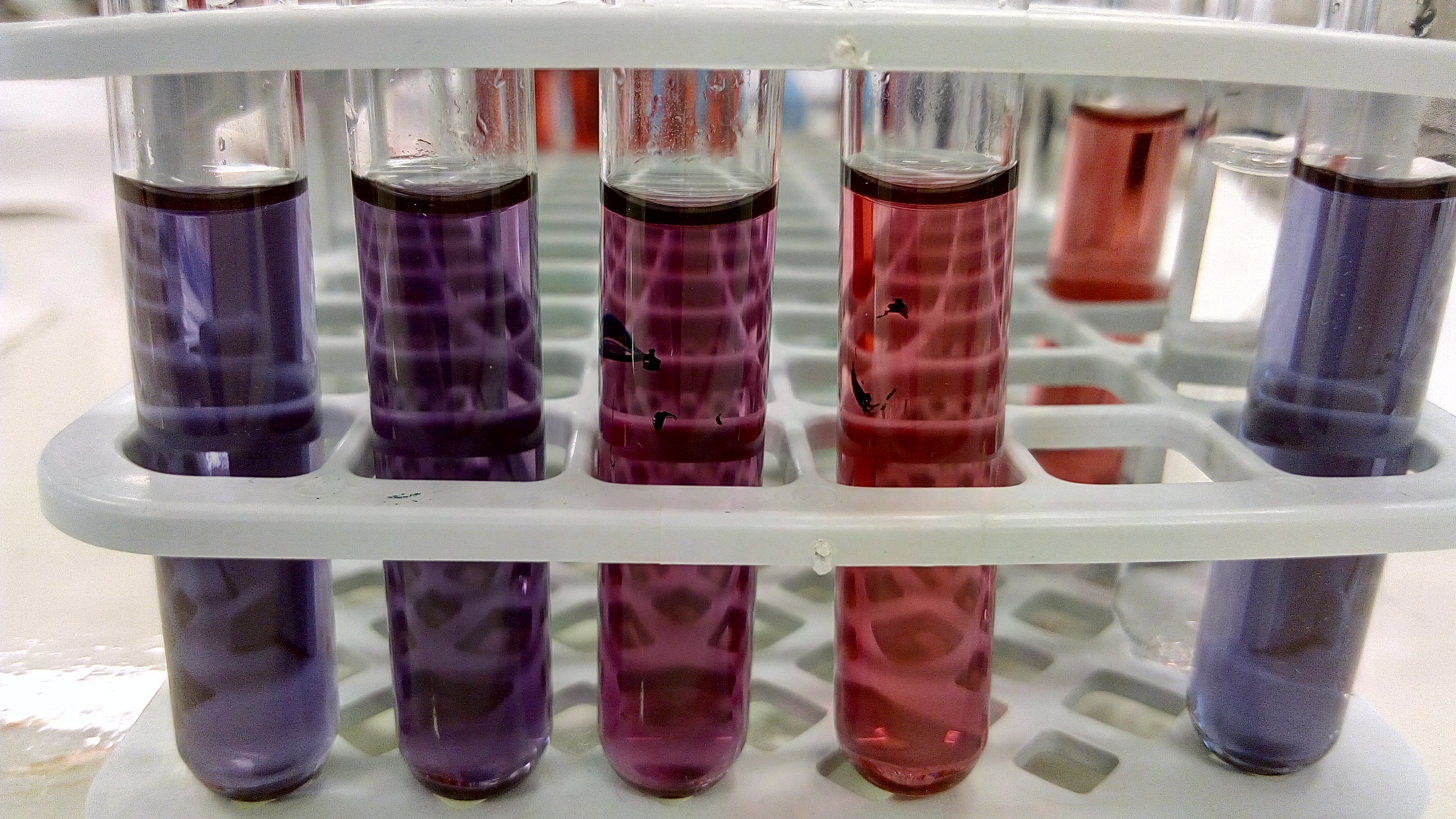
Gold nanoparticle-based (Au-NP) biosensor for Glutathione (GSH). The AuNPs are functionalised with a chemical group that binds to GSH and makes the NPs partially collapse, and thus change colour. The exact amount of GSH can be derived via UV-vis spectroscopy through a calibration curve.

Gold nanoparticles improve the sensitivity of optical sensors in response to the change in the local refractive index. The angle of the incidence light for surface plasmon resonance, an interaction between light waves and conducting electrons in metal, changes when other substances are bounded to the metal surface. Because gold is very sensitive to its surroundings' dielectric constant, binding of an analyte significantly shifts the gold nanoparticle's SPR and therefore allows for more sensitive detection. Gold nanoparticle could also amplify the SPR signal. When the plasmon wave pass through the gold nanoparticle, the charge density in the wave and the electron I the gold interact and result in a higher energy response, referred to as electron coupling. When the analyte and bio-receptor both bind to the gold, the apparent mass of the analyte increases and therefore amplifies the signal. These properties had been used to build a DNA sensor with 1000-fold greater sensitivity than without the Au NP. Humidity sensors have also been built by altering the atom interspacing between molecules with humidity change, the interspacing change would also result in a change of the Au NP's LSPR.

==== Electrochemical biosensor ====
Electrochemical sensor convert biological information into electrical signals that could be detected. The conductivity and biocompatibility of Au NP allow it to act as "electron wire". It transfers electron between the electrode and the active site of the enzyme. It could be accomplished in two ways: attach the Au NP to either the enzyme or the electrode. GNP-glucose oxidase monolayer electrode was constructed use these two methods. The Au NP allowed more freedom in the enzyme's orientation and therefore more sensitive and stable detection. Au NP also acts as immobilization platform for the enzyme. Most biomolecules denatures or lose its activity when interacted with the electrode. The biocompatibility and high surface energy of Au allow it to bind to a large amount of protein without altering its activity and results in a more sensitive sensor. Moreover, Au NP also catalyzes biological reactions. Gold nanoparticle under 2 nm has shown catalytic activity to the oxidation of styrene.

==== Immunological biosensor ====
Gold nanoparticles have been coated with peptides and glycans for use in immunological detection methods. The possibility to use glyconanoparticles in ELISA was unexpected, but the method seems to have a high sensitivity and thus offers potential for development of specific assays for diagnostic identification of antibodies in patient sera.

=== Thin films ===
Gold nanoparticles capped with organic ligands, such as alkanethiol molecules, can self-assemble into large monolayers (>cm^{2}). The particles are first prepared in organic solvent, such as chloroform or toluene, and are then spread into monolayers either on a liquid surface or on a solid substrate. Such interfacial thin films of nanoparticles have close relationship with Langmuir-Blodgett monolayers made from surfactants.

The mechanical properties of nanoparticle monolayers have been studied extensively. For 5 nm spheres capped with dodecanethiol, the Young's modulus of the monolayer is on the order of GPa. The mechanics of the membranes are guided by strong interactions between ligand shells on adjacent particles. Upon fracture, the films crack perpendicular to the direction of strain at a fracture stress of 11 $\pm$ 2.6 MPa, comparable to that of cross-linked polymer films. Free-standing nanoparticle membranes exhibit bending rigidity on the order of 10$^{5}$ eV, higher than what is predicted in theory for continuum plates of the same thickness, due to nonlocal microstructural constraints such as nonlocal coupling of particle rotational degrees of freedom. On the other hand, resistance to bending is found to be greatly reduced in nanoparticle monolayers that are supported at the air/water interface, possibly due to screening of ligand interactions in a wet environment.

== Surface chemistry ==
In many different types of colloidal gold syntheses, the interface of the nanoparticles can display widely different character – ranging from an interface similar to a self-assembled monolayer to a disordered boundary with no repeating patterns. Beyond the Au-Ligand interface, conjugation of the interfacial ligands with various functional moieties (from small organic molecules to polymers to DNA to RNA) afford colloidal gold much of its vast functionality.

=== Ligand exchange/functionalization ===
After initial nanoparticle synthesis, colloidal gold ligands are often exchanged with new ligands designed for specific applications. For example, Au NPs produced via the Turkevich-style (or Citrate Reduction) method are readily reacted via ligand exchange reactions, due to the relatively weak binding between the carboxyl groups and the surfaces of the NPs. This ligand exchange can produce conjugation with a number of biomolecules from DNA to RNA to proteins to polymers (such as PEG) to increase biocompatibility and functionality. For example, ligands have been shown to enhance catalytic activity by mediating interactions between adsorbates and the active gold surfaces for specific oxygenation reactions. Ligand exchange can also be used to promote phase transfer of the colloidal particles. Ligand exchange is also possible with alkane thiol-arrested NPs produced from the Brust-type synthesis method, although higher temperatures are needed to promote the rate of the ligand detachment. An alternative method for further functionalization is achieved through the conjugation of the ligands with other molecules, though this method can cause the colloidal stability of the Au NPs to breakdown.

=== Ligand removal ===
In many cases, as in various high-temperature catalytic applications of Au, the removal of the capping ligands produces more desirable physicochemical properties. The removal of ligands from colloidal gold while maintaining a relatively constant number of Au atoms per Au NP can be difficult due to the tendency for these bare clusters to aggregate. The removal of ligands is partially achievable by simply washing away all excess capping ligands, though this method is ineffective in removing all capping ligand. More often ligand removal achieved under high temperature or light ablation followed by washing. Alternatively, the ligands can be electrochemically etched off.

=== Surface structure and chemical environment ===
The precise structure of the ligands on the surface of colloidal gold NPs impact the properties of the colloidal gold particles. Binding conformations and surface packing of the capping ligands at the surface of the colloidal gold NPs tend to differ greatly from bulk surface model adsorption, largely due to the high curvature observed at the nanoparticle surfaces. Thiolate-gold interfaces at the nanoscale have been well-studied and the thiolate ligands are observed to pull Au atoms off of the surface of the particles to form "staple" motifs that have significant Thiyl-Au(0) character. The citrate-gold surface, on the other hand, is relatively less-studied due to the vast number of binding conformations of the citrate to the curved gold surfaces. A study performed in 2014 identified that the most-preferred binding of the citrate involves two carboxylic acids and the hydroxyl group of the citrate binds three surface metal atoms.

== Health and safety ==
As gold nanoparticles (AuNPs) are further investigated for targeted drug delivery in humans, their toxicity needs to be considered. For the most part, it is suggested that AuNPs are biocompatible, but the concentrations at which they become toxic needs to be determined, and if those concentrations fall within the range of used concentrations. Toxicity can be tested in vitro and in vivo. In vitro toxicity results can vary depending on the type of the cellular growth media with different protein compositions, the method used to determine cellular toxicity (cell health, cell stress, how many cells are taken into a cell), and the capping ligands in solution. In vivo assessments can determine the general health of an organism (abnormal behavior, weight loss, average life span) as well as tissue specific toxicology (kidney, liver, blood) and inflammation and oxidative responses. In vitro experiments are more popular than in vivo experiments because in vitro experiments are more simplistic to perform than in vivo experiments.

=== Toxicity and hazards in synthesis ===
While AuNPs themselves appear to have low or negligible toxicity, and the literature shows that the toxicity has much more to do with the ligands rather than the particles themselves, the synthesis of them involves chemicals that are hazardous. Sodium borohydride, a harsh reagent, is used to reduce the gold ions to gold metal. The gold ions usually come from chloroauric acid, a potent acid. Because of the high toxicity and hazard of reagents used to synthesize AuNPs, the need for more "green" methods of synthesis arose.

=== Toxicity due to capping ligands ===
Some of the capping ligands associated with AuNPs can be toxic while others are nontoxic. In gold nanorods (AuNRs), it has been shown that a strong cytotoxicity was associated with CTAB-stabilized AuNRs at low concentration, but it is thought that free CTAB was the culprit in toxicity . Modifications that overcoat these AuNRs reduces this toxicity in human colon cancer cells (HT-29) by preventing CTAB molecules from desorbing from the AuNRs back into the solution. Ligand toxicity can also be seen in AuNPs. Compared to the 90% toxicity of HAuCl_{4} at the same concentration, AuNPs with carboxylate termini were shown to be non-toxic. Large AuNPs conjugated with biotin, cysteine, citrate, and glucose were not toxic in human leukemia cells (K562) for concentrations up to 0.25 M. Also, citrate-capped gold nanospheres (AuNSs) have been proven to be compatible with human blood and did not cause platelet aggregation or an immune response. However, citrate-capped gold nanoparticles sizes 8-37 nm were found to be lethally toxic for mice, causing shorter lifespans, severe sickness, loss of appetite and weight, hair discoloration, and damage to the liver, spleen, and lungs; gold nanoparticles accumulated in the spleen and liver after traveling a section of the immune system. There are mixed-views for polyethylene glycol (PEG)-modified AuNPs. These AuNPs were found to be toxic in mouse liver by injection, causing cell death and minor inflammation. However, AuNPs conjugated with PEG copolymers showed negligible toxicity towards human colon cells (Caco-2). AuNP toxicity also depends on the overall charge of the ligands. In certain doses, AuNSs that have positively-charged ligands are toxic in monkey kidney cells (Cos-1), human red blood cells, and E. coli because of the AuNSs interaction with the negatively-charged cell membrane; AuNSs with negatively-charged ligands have been found to be nontoxic in these species. In addition to the previously mentioned in vivo and in vitro experiments, other similar experiments have been performed. Alkylthiolate-AuNPs with trimethlyammonium ligand termini mediate the translocation of DNA across mammalian cell membranes in vitro at a high level, which is detrimental to these cells. Corneal haze in rabbits have been healed in vivo by using polyethylemnimine-capped gold nanoparticles that were transfected with a gene that promotes wound healing and inhibits corneal fibrosis.

=== Toxicity due to size of nanoparticles ===
Toxicity in certain systems can also be dependent on the size of the nanoparticle. AuNSs size 1.4 nm were found to be toxic in human skin cancer cells (SK-Mel-28), human cervical cancer cells (HeLa), mouse fibroblast cells (L929), and mouse macrophages (J774A.1), while 0.8, 1.2, and 1.8 nm sized AuNSs were less toxic by a six-fold amount and 15 nm AuNSs were nontoxic. There is some evidence for AuNP buildup after injection in in vivo studies, but this is very size dependent. 1.8 nm AuNPs were found to be almost totally trapped in the lungs of rats. Different sized AuNPs were found to build-up in the blood, brain, stomach, pancreas, kidneys, liver, and spleen.

Biosafety and biokinetics investigations on biodegradable ultrasmall-in-nano architectures have demonstrated that gold nanoparticles are able to avoid metal accumulation in organisms through escaping by the renal pathway.

== Synthesis ==
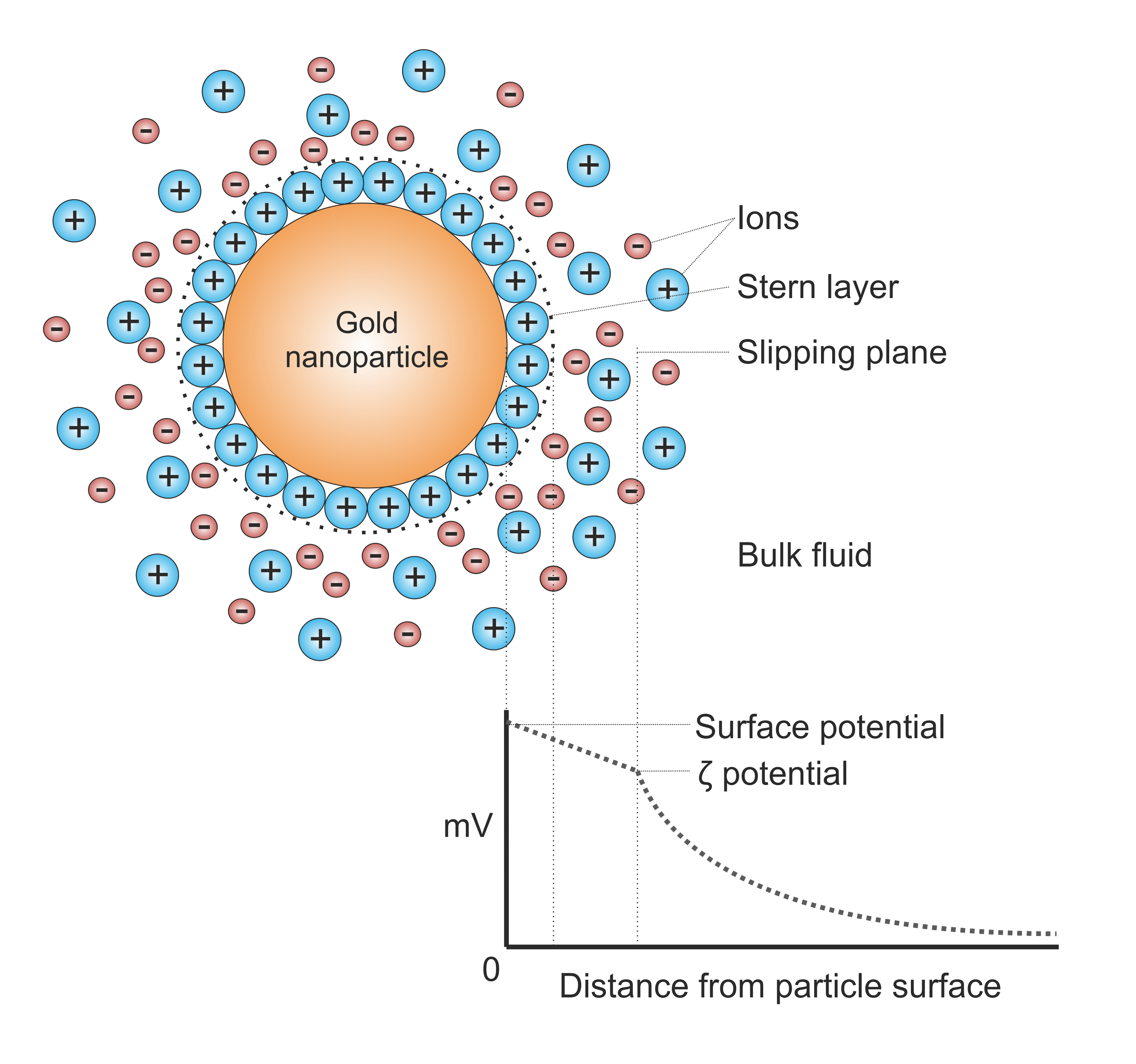
Potential difference as a function of distance from particle surface.

Generally, gold nanoparticles are produced in a liquid ("liquid chemical methods") by reduction of chloroauric acid (H[AuCl_{4}]). To prevent the particles from aggregating, stabilizing agents are added. Citrate acts both as the reducing agent and colloidal stabilizer.

They can be functionalized with various organic ligands to create organic-inorganic hybrids with advanced functionality.

=== Turkevich method ===
This simple method was pioneered by J. Turkevich et al. in 1951 and refined by G. Frens in the 1970s. It produces modestly monodisperse spherical gold nanoparticles of around 10–20 nm in diameter. Larger particles can be produced, but at the cost of monodispersity and shape. In this method, hot chloroauric acid is treated with sodium citrate solution, producing colloidal gold. The Turkevich reaction proceeds via formation of transient gold nanowires. These gold nanowires are responsible for the dark appearance of the reaction solution before it turns ruby-red.

=== Capping agents ===
A capping agent is used during nanoparticle synthesis to inhibit particle growth and aggregation. The chemical blocks or reduces reactivity at the periphery of the particle—a good capping agent has a high affinity for the new nuclei. Citrate ions or tannic acid function both as a reducing agent and a capping agent. Less sodium citrate results in larger particles.

=== Brust-Schiffrin method ===
This method was discovered by Brust and Schiffrin in the early 1990s, and can be used to produce gold nanoparticles in organic liquids that are normally not miscible with water (like toluene). It involves the reaction of a chlorauric acid solution with tetraoctylammonium bromide (TOAB) solution in toluene and sodium borohydride as an anti-coagulant and a reducing agent, respectively.

Here, the gold nanoparticles will be around 5–6 nm. NaBH_{4} is the reducing agent, and TOAB is both the phase transfer catalyst and the stabilizing agent.

TOAB does not bind to the gold nanoparticles particularly strongly, so the solution will aggregate gradually over the course of approximately two weeks. To prevent this, one can add a stronger binding agent, like a thiol (in particular, alkanethiols), which will bind to gold, producing a near-permanent solution. Alkanethiol protected gold nanoparticles can be precipitated and then redissolved. Thiols are better binding agents because there is a strong affinity for the gold-sulfur bonds that form when the two substances react with each other. Tetra-dodecanthiol is a commonly used strong binding agent to synthesize smaller particles. Some of the phase transfer agent may remain bound to the purified nanoparticles, this may affect physical properties such as solubility. In order to remove as much of this agent as possible, the nanoparticles must be further purified by soxhlet extraction.

=== Perrault method ===
This approach, discovered by Perrault and Chan in 2009, uses hydroquinone to reduce HAuCl_{4} in an aqueous solution that contains 15 nm gold nanoparticle seeds. This seed-based method of synthesis is similar to that used in photographic film development, in which silver grains within the film grow through addition of reduced silver onto their surface. Likewise, gold nanoparticles can act in conjunction with hydroquinone to catalyze reduction of ionic gold onto their surface. The presence of a stabilizer such as citrate results in controlled deposition of gold atoms onto the particles, and growth. Typically, the nanoparticle seeds are produced using the citrate method. The hydroquinone method complements that of Frens, as it extends the range of monodispersed spherical particle sizes that can be produced. Whereas the Frens method is ideal for particles of 12–20 nm, the hydroquinone method can produce particles of at least 30–300 nm.

=== Martin method ===
This simple method, discovered by Martin and Eah in 2010, generates nearly monodisperse "naked" gold nanoparticles in water. Precisely controlling the reduction stoichiometry by adjusting the ratio of NaBH_{4}-NaOH ions to HAuCl_{4}-HCl ions within the "sweet zone," along with heating, enables reproducible diameter tuning between 3–6 nm. The aqueous particles are colloidally stable due to their high charge from the excess ions in solution. These particles can be coated with various hydrophilic functionalities, or mixed with hydrophobic ligands for applications in non-polar solvents. In non-polar solvents the nanoparticles remain highly charged, and self-assemble on liquid droplets to form 2D monolayer films of monodisperse nanoparticles.

=== Nanotech studies ===
Bacillus licheniformis can be used in synthesis of gold nanocubes with sizes between 10 and 100 nanometres. Gold nanoparticles are usually synthesized at high temperatures in organic solvents or using toxic reagents. The bacteria produce them in much milder conditions.

=== Navarro et al. method ===
For particles larger than 30 nm, control of particle size with a low polydispersity of spherical gold nanoparticles remains challenging. In order to provide maximum control on the NP structure, Navarro and co-workers used a modified Turkevitch-Frens procedure using sodium acetylacetonate as the reducing agent and sodium citrate as the stabilizer.

=== Sonolysis ===
Another method for the experimental generation of gold particles is by sonolysis. The first method of this type was invented by Baigent and Müller. This work pioneered the use of ultrasound to provide the energy for the processes involved and allowed the creation of gold particles with a diameter of under 10 nm. In another method using ultrasound, the reaction of an aqueous solution of HAuCl_{4} with glucose, the reducing agents are hydroxyl radicals and sugar pyrolysis radicals (forming at the interfacial region between the collapsing cavities and the bulk water) and the morphology obtained is that of nanoribbons with width 30–50 nm and length of several micrometers. These ribbons are very flexible and can bend with angles larger than 90°. When glucose is replaced by cyclodextrin (a glucose oligomer), only spherical gold particles are obtained, suggesting that glucose is essential in directing the morphology toward a ribbon.

=== Block copolymer-mediated method ===
An economical, environmentally benign and fast synthesis methodology for gold nanoparticles using block copolymer has been developed by Sakai et al. In this synthesis methodology, block copolymer plays the dual role of a reducing agent as well as a stabilizing agent. The formation of gold nanoparticles comprises three main steps: reduction of gold salt ion by block copolymers in the solution and formation of gold clusters, adsorption of block copolymers on gold clusters and further reduction of gold salt ions on the surfaces of these gold clusters for the growth of gold particles in steps, and finally its stabilization by block copolymers. But this method usually has a limited-yield (nanoparticle concentration), which does not increase with the increase in the gold salt concentration. Ray et al. improved this synthesis method by enhancing the nanoparticle yield by manyfold at ambient temperature.

== See also ==
- Colloidal silver
- Fiveling, also called decahedral nanoparticles
- Gold nanorods
- Gold nanoparticles in chemotherapy
- Nanozymes
- Colloidal gold protein assay
