= Indigo FM (Australia) =

Indigo FM 88.0 / 87.6
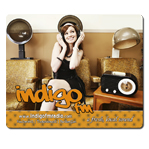

Australia
- Broadcast area: Beechworth, Yackandandah, Rutherglen in North East Victoria, Australia
- Frequency: 87.6 MHz / 88.0 MHz

Programming
- Format: Adult Alternative radio

Ownership
- Owner: Indigo FM Inc.

History
- First air date: July 1, 2010

Links
- Website: www.indigofmradio.com

Indigo FM is a non-profit, low-powered open narrowcast (L.P.O.N.) radio station transmitting in north east Victoria, Australia within the Indigo Shire. The broadcast sites include Beechworth (88.0FM), Yackandandah (88.0FM) and Kiewa-Tangambalanga (88.0FM). The format of Indigo FM is adult alternative, including a mix of blues, soul, Americana and contemporary music. Indigo FM has a strong emphasis on Australian independent artists and have around 40 volunteer presenters across their three sites. Indigo FM is run entirely by volunteers and commenced broadcasting in Beechworth in June, 2010. Yackandandah came on air in early October, 2010. Kiewa-Tangambalanga commenced broadcasting in late November 2018. A Chiltern site is due to commence transmission on 87.6FM in the first half of 2019. A Rutherglen site also operated from July, 2013 to October, 2016.
