= Gold cluster =

Gold clusters, a part of cluster chemistry, describe molecular clusters of gold and some well-defined colloidal particles. Several can described as nanoparticles, with diameters of less than one micrometer.

== Optical properties ==
Gold nanoclusters have received intense scrutiny of their optoelectronic properties.

== Bare gold clusters ==
Bare gold clusters, i.e., clusters without stabilizing ligand shells can be synthesized and studied in vacuum using molecular beam techniques. Their structures have been experimentally studied using, e.g., anion photoelectron spectroscopy, far-infrared spectroscopy, as well as measurements of their ion mobility and electron diffraction studies in conjunction with quantum chemical calculations. The structures of such clusters differ strongly from those of the ligand-stabilized ones, indicating an pivotal influence of the chemical environment on the cluster structure. A notable example is Au_{20} which forms a perfect tetrahedron in which the Au atom packing closely resembles the atomic arrangement in the fcc bulk structure of metallic gold. Evidence has been presented for the existence of hollow golden cages with the partial formula Au_{n}^{−} with n = 16 to 18. These clusters, with diameter of 550 picometres, are generated by laser vaporization and characterized by photoelectron spectroscopy.

== Structure of ligand-stabilized Au clusters ==
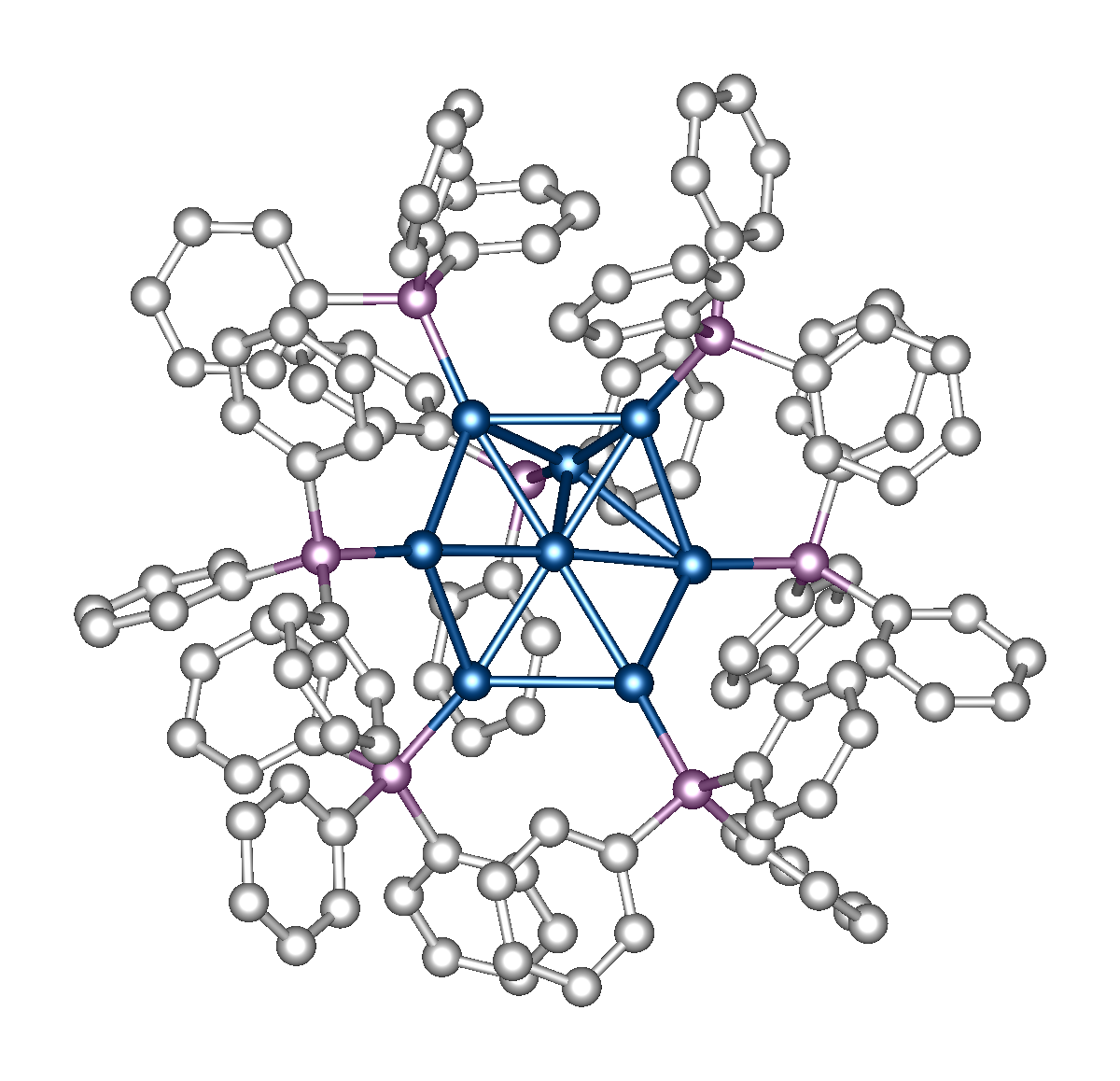
Structure of [Au_{8}(PPh_{3})_{7}]^{2+}.

Bulk gold exhibits a face-centered cubic (fcc) structure. As gold particle size decreases the fcc structure of gold often changes into nanoparticles with five-fold or icosahedral structures, particularly in clusters of a few atoms illustrated by Au_{13}. It can be shown that the fcc structure can be extended by a half unit cell in order to make it look like a cuboctahedral structure. The cuboctahedral structure maintains the cubic-closed pack and symmetry of fcc. This can be thought of as redefining the unit cell into a more complicated cell. Each edge of the cuboctahedron represents a peripheral Au–Au bond. The cuboctahedron has 24 edges while the icosahedron has 30 edges; the transition from cuboctahedron to icosahedron is favored since the increase in bonds contributes to the overall stability of the icosahedron structure.

The centered icosahedral cluster Au_{13} is the basis of constructing large gold nanoclusters. Au_{13} is the endpoint of atom-by-atom growth. In other words, starting with one gold atom up to Au_{12}, each successful cluster is created by adding one additional atom. The icosahedral motif is found in many gold clusters through vertex sharing (Au_{25} and Au_{36}), face-fusion (Au_{23} and Au_{29}), and interpenetrating bi-icosahedrons (Au_{19}, Au_{23}, Au_{26}, and Au_{29}). Larger gold nanoclusters can often be reduced to a series of icosahedrons connecting, overlapping, and/or surrounding each other. The crystallization process of gold nanoclusters with 561 atoms from the liquid involves the formation of surface segments that grow towards the center of the cluster. The cluster assumes an icosahedral structure because of the associated surface energy reduction. Icosahedral structures and also five-fold twins are also common in nanoparticles produced by other methods.

== Discrete gold clusters ==
Well-defined, molecular clusters are known, invariably containing organic ligands on their exteriors. Two examples are [Au_{6}C(P(C_{6}H_{5})_{3})_{6}]^{2+} and [Au_{9}(P(C_{6}H_{5})_{3})_{8}]^{3+}. In order to generate naked gold clusters for catalytic applications, the ligands must be removed, which is typically done via a high-temperature (200 °C/392 °F or higher) calcination process, but can also be achieved chemically at low temperatures (below 100 °C/212 °F), e.g. using a peroxide-assisted route.

== Colloidal clusters ==
Gold clusters can be obtained in colloid form. Such colloids often occur with a surface coating of alkanethiols or proteins. Such clusters can be used in immunohistochemical staining. Gold metal nanoparticles (NPs) are characterized by an intense absorption in the visible region, which enhances the utility of these species for the development of completely optical devices. The wavelength of this surface plasmon resonance (SPR) band depends on the size and shape of the nanoparticles as well as their interactions with the surrounding medium. The presence of this band enhances the potential utility of gold nanoparticle as building blocks for devices for data storage, ultrafast switching, and gas sensors. Whilst plasmonic gold nanoparticles only exhibit electric moments, clusters of such particles can exhibit magnetic moments making them of great interest for use in optical metamaterials

== Catalysis ==
Some claims suggest that gold clusters have commercial applications as catalysis.

When supported on a FeOOH surface, gold clusters catalyze oxidation of CO at ambient temperatures. Similarly gold clusters supported on TiO_{2} can oxidize CO at temperatures as low as 40K. Catalytic activity may correlate with the size and structure of gold nanoclusters, both the energetics and electronic properties with size and structure.

== See also ==
- Thiolate-protected gold cluster
- Bismuth cluster
- Fiveling
- Icosahedral twins
