= Hydrogen spillover =

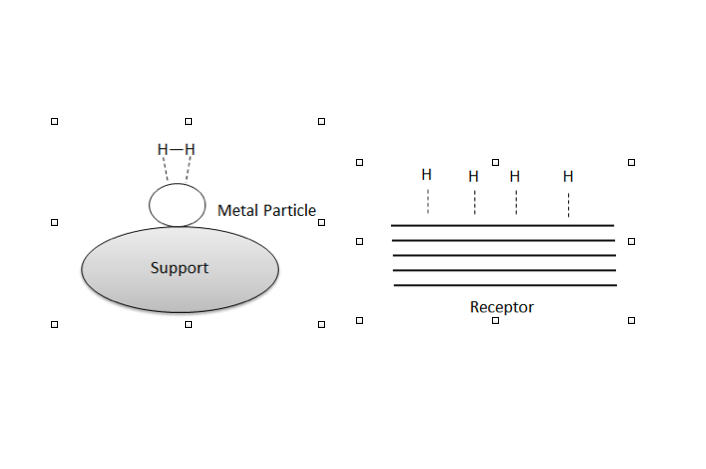
Figure 1: Setup of metal catalyst on a support, the support of which can absorb hydrogen atoms. The receptor represents other optional hydrogen deficient compounds, such as graphene in the context of metal catalysis.

In heterogeneous catalysis, hydrogen molecules can be adsorbed and dissociated by the metal catalyst. Hydrogen spillover is the migration of hydrogen atoms from the metal catalyst onto the nonmetal support or adsorbate. Spillover, generally, is the transport of a species adsorbed or formed on a surface onto another surface. Hydrogen spillover can be characterized by three major steps, the first being where molecular hydrogen is split via dissociative chemisorption into its constitutive atoms on a transition metal catalyst surface, followed by migration from the catalyst to the substrate, culminating in their diffusion throughout the substrate surfaces and/or in the bulk materials.

== Mechanism and trends ==
=== Mechanism ===
The mechanism behind hydrogen spillover has been long disputed. Khoobiar’s work in 1964 marks the nascency of the spillover concept. In his findings, yellow WO_{3} can be reduced by H_{2} to a blue compound with the use of a platinum catalyst. Since the phenomenon was not found when using Al_{2}O_{3} as the catalyst, he claimed that the dissociative chemisorption of H_{2} molecules on the Pt particles created hydrogen atoms. The hydrogen atoms migrated from the Pt surface to the WO_{3} particles and reduced them to blue WO_{3−x} particles.

Essentially, hydrogen atoms would migrate from a hydrogen-rich to a hydrogen-poor surface. However, these atoms are usually not generated on the surface of a support metal. Hence, the two conditions for hydrogen spillover include the creation of hydrogen atoms (requires catalysts capable of dissociating and absorbing hydrogen) and the ability of hydrogen atoms to be transported.

Attempts to characterize the mechanism of hydrogen spillover have seen the use of radiation photoelectron spectroscopy to analyze the shift between different oxidation states of the support (commonly metal oxides) via their respective emission spectra. In general, the mechanism is thought to proceed via the transfer of neutral hydrogen atoms to the support upon overcoming an activation energy barrier. This has even been observed at temperatures as low as 180K in metal-organic framework (MOF) catalysts laced with Palladium nanoparticles (PdnP’s). Upon transfer to the support, they assume the role of Lewis bases where they donate electrons and reversibly reduce the sorbent. Additionally, the hydrodesulfurization of dibenzothiophene show that hydroxyl groups seem to favor the migration of spillover hydrogen, whereas sodium cations may trap the spillover hydrogen and are detrimental to hydrogenation pathway.

Recently the mechanism of hydrogen spillover has been described using a precisely nanofabricated model system and single-particle spectromicroscopy. Occurrence of hydrogen spillover on reducible supports such as titanium oxide is established, yet questions remain about whether hydrogen spillover can take place on nonreducible supports such as aluminium oxide. The study shows a convincing proof of the spillover effect at well-defined distances away from the metal catalyst explaining why hydrogen spillover is slower on an aluminum oxide catalyst support than on a titanium oxide catalyst support. The results reveal that hydrogen spillover is fast and efficient on titanium oxide, and extremely slow and short-ranged on aluminium oxide. A recent study has shown that the metal oxide supports that are able to perform hydrogen spillover can catalyze hydrogenation reactions more efficiently (even at room temperature) by supported Pd catalysts.

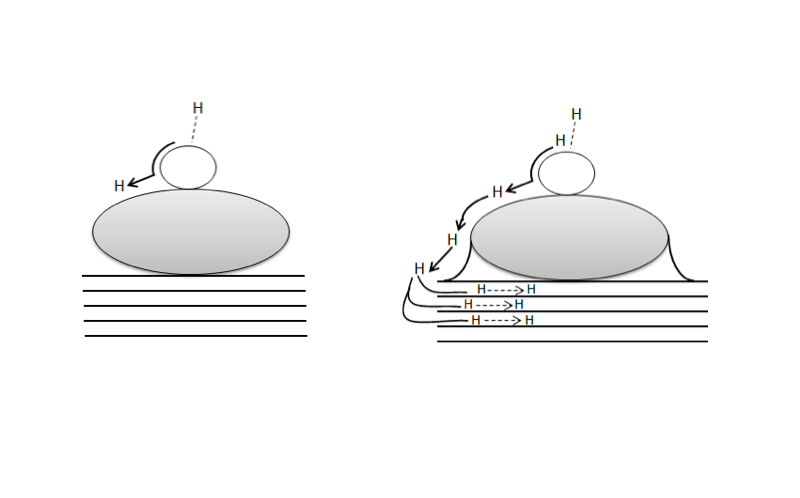
Figure 2: Dissociative chemisorption of H_{2} on metal catalysts. Hydrogen atoms move from a hydrogen-rich to a hydrogen-poor surface.

=== Trends ===
Hydrogen spillover increases with adsorption temperature and metal dispersion. A correlation has been reported between available surface area and the capacity for hydrogen storage. For PdnP-containing MOFs, in the presence of saturated metal particles, the capacity for hydrogen spillover only relied on the sorbent’s surface area and pore size. On catalysts such as platinum or nickel, atomic hydrogen can be generated at a high frequency. Through surface diffusion, multi-functional transport of hydrogen atoms can enhance a reaction and even regenerate a catalyst. However, problems present in the strength of the hydrogen-support bond; too strong of an interaction would hinder its extraction via reverse spillover and nullify its function as a fuel cell. Conversely, too weak a bond and the hydrogens are easily lost to the environment.

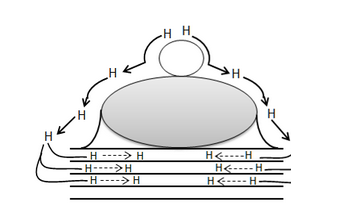
Figure 3: Hydrogen storage in carbon materials through spillover techniques. In this case, the receptor is a carbon nanotube. Note that while physical mixtures of a primary hydrogen spillover source and a secondary receptor demonstrate moderate storage capacity, adding a bridge to improve the contact between the support metal and the receptor serves to double or triple hydrogen storage capacity on the receptor.

== Applications ==
With burgeoning interest in alternative energy sources, the prospect of hydrogen’s role as a fuel has become a major driving force for the optimization of storage methods, particularly at ambient temperatures where their application would be more practical for common use. Hydrogen spillover has emerged as a possible technique for achieving high-density hydrogen storage at near-ambient conditions in lightweight, solid-state materials as adsorbents. Hydrogen storage in carbon materials can be significantly enhanced by spillover techniques. Current trends include the use of metal-organic frameworks (MOFs) and other porous materials with high surface area for such storage, including but not exclusive to nanocarbons (e.g. graphene, carbon nanotubes), zeolites, and nanostructured materials. Hydrogen atom diffusion on nanostructured graphitic carbon materials is primarily governed by physisorption of hydrogen atoms. Singled-walled nanotubes and multi-walled nanotubes are the best acceptor of spilt over hydrogen atoms.

Another recent study has shown that the synthesis of methanol from both CO and CO_{2} over Cu/ZrO_{2} involves the spillover of H atoms formed on Cu to the surface of ZrO_{2}. The atomic H then participates in the hydrogenation of carbon-containing species to methanol.
