= Indigo (Maja Keuc album) =

Studio album by Maja Keuc
- Released: December 1, 2011
- Genres: Pop, Soul, Blues, Jazz
- Length: 40:48
- Label: Reflektor Music
- Producers: Krešimir Tomec, Sebastijan Duh, Tadej Kampl, Marco Grabber

Indigo is a debut album by Slovenian vocalist Maja Keuc. There's 11 songs on the album that are a mix of pop, jazz, soul and blues rhythms. Half of the songs are in English and there is a remixed version of Eurovision song No One.

== Track listing ==
1. "Zmorem" ( 1 in Slovenia)
2. "Free Love" (5 in Slovenia)
3. "Tako lepo mi je"
4. "Na pol poti"
5. "Krog"
6. "You're A Tree And I'm A Balloon"
7. "Get This Party Started"
8. "Go With The Flow"
9. "Again (feat. Camall)"
10. "Ta planet" (1 in Slovenia)
11. "No One (remix)"

Album of the year and best femim Artist in 2012 Slovenias Music Awards
