= Indigo (restaurant) =

Mumbai restaurant (closed)

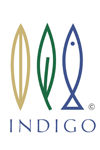

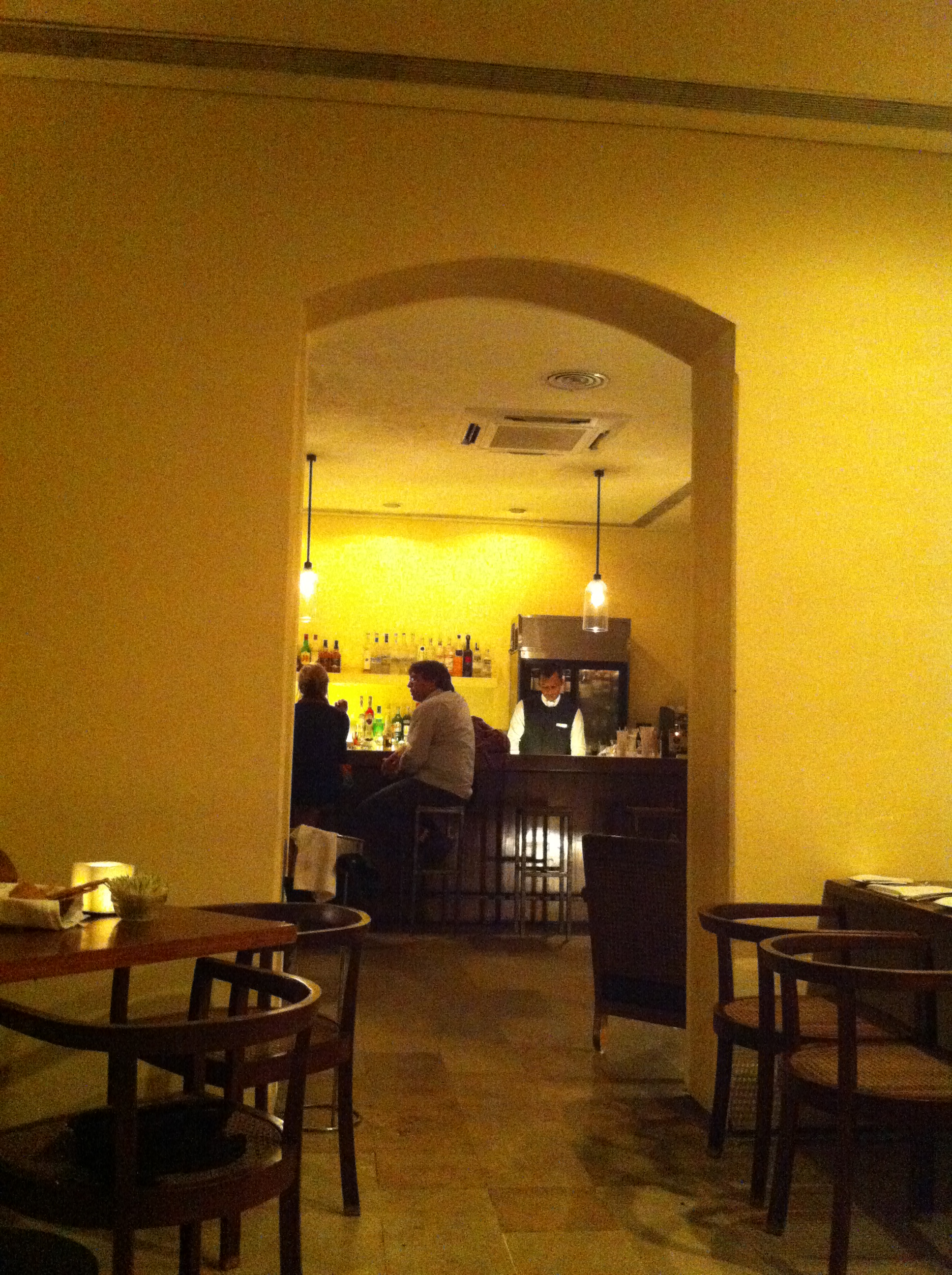

- Location within Mumbai

Restaurant information
- Established: April 30, 1999 (26 years ago)
- Closed: 29 April 2018 (7 years ago)
- Head chef: Rahul Akerkar
- Food type: European, Mediterranean
- Location: Mumbai, Maharashtra, India
- Coordinates: 18°55′19″N 72°49′55″E
- Website: foodindigo.com/mumbai/

Indigo was a restaurant founded by the Indian chef Rahul Akerkar in 1999 in Mumbai, India, in a restored colonial bungalow behind the Taj Mahal Palace Hotel. The restaurant was one of the first standalone fine-dining restaurants in the country to serve quality European cuisine outside the luxury hotel industry. It is credited with influencing the Indian restaurant industry in the country's post-liberalisation era. Food critic Vir Sanghvi called the restaurant "one of the most important establishments in Indian restaurant history". It was included in the top 60 restaurants in the world by Condé Nast Traveler.

The restaurant closed on 29 April 2018, following the expiration of the property's lease and failed renegotiations.

== History and significance ==
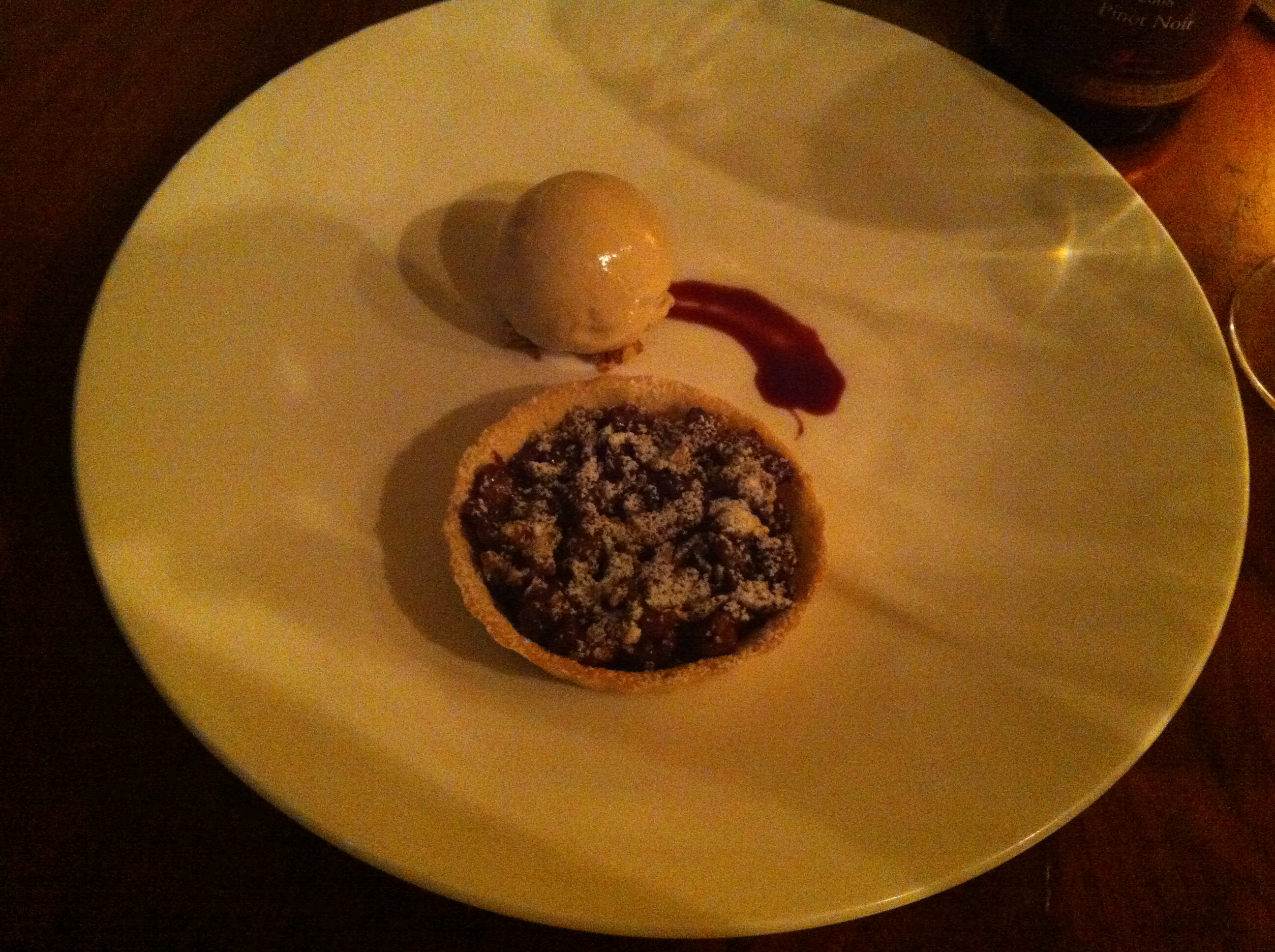
Fig tart at Indigo

Akerkar worked in restaurants in the United States for a decade before returning to India in 1989. He ran two influential eateries, Just Desserts and Under the Over, in the 1990s before founding deGustibus Hospitality and opening Indigo in 1999. At a time when it was difficult to find high quality Continental food outside five-star hotels, the restaurant came to be noted for its innovation in the industry, by relying on carefully sourced ingredients and ever-changing menus. The restaurant often had a waiting list of more than three months and was frequented by noted personalities. The Rolling Stones dined at the restaurant after playing in Mumbai, and the restaurant played host to David Cameron, Salman Rushdie, Brad Pitt, Angelina Jolie.

In her 2019 book that surveyed the Indian restaurant industry, Business on a Platter: What Makes Restaurants Sizzle or Fizzle Out, food writer Anoothi Vishal wrote: "Indigo...ushered in a new type of restaurant in India. These can be defined as experiential restaurants, where a younger lot of diners went not just to satisfy a basic need for food, but to meet an aspiration for a certain lifestyle the restaurant symbolized."

== Closure ==
The lease of the colonial bungalow, where the restaurant was housed, expired in April 2018. After the extension negotiations with the landlord failed, the holding company, deGustibus, decided to close the restaurant, and the last customers were served on 29 April 2018.

== Bibliography ==
- Lyons, Nan (2010). Around the World in Eighty Meals. Red Rock Press. ISBN 9781933176444.
- Vishal, Anoothi (2019). Business on a Platter: What Makes Restaurants Sizzle or Fizzle Out. Hachette UK. ISBN 9789350095911.
