= Indigo Lake (Alaska) =

Lake in the state of Alaska, United States

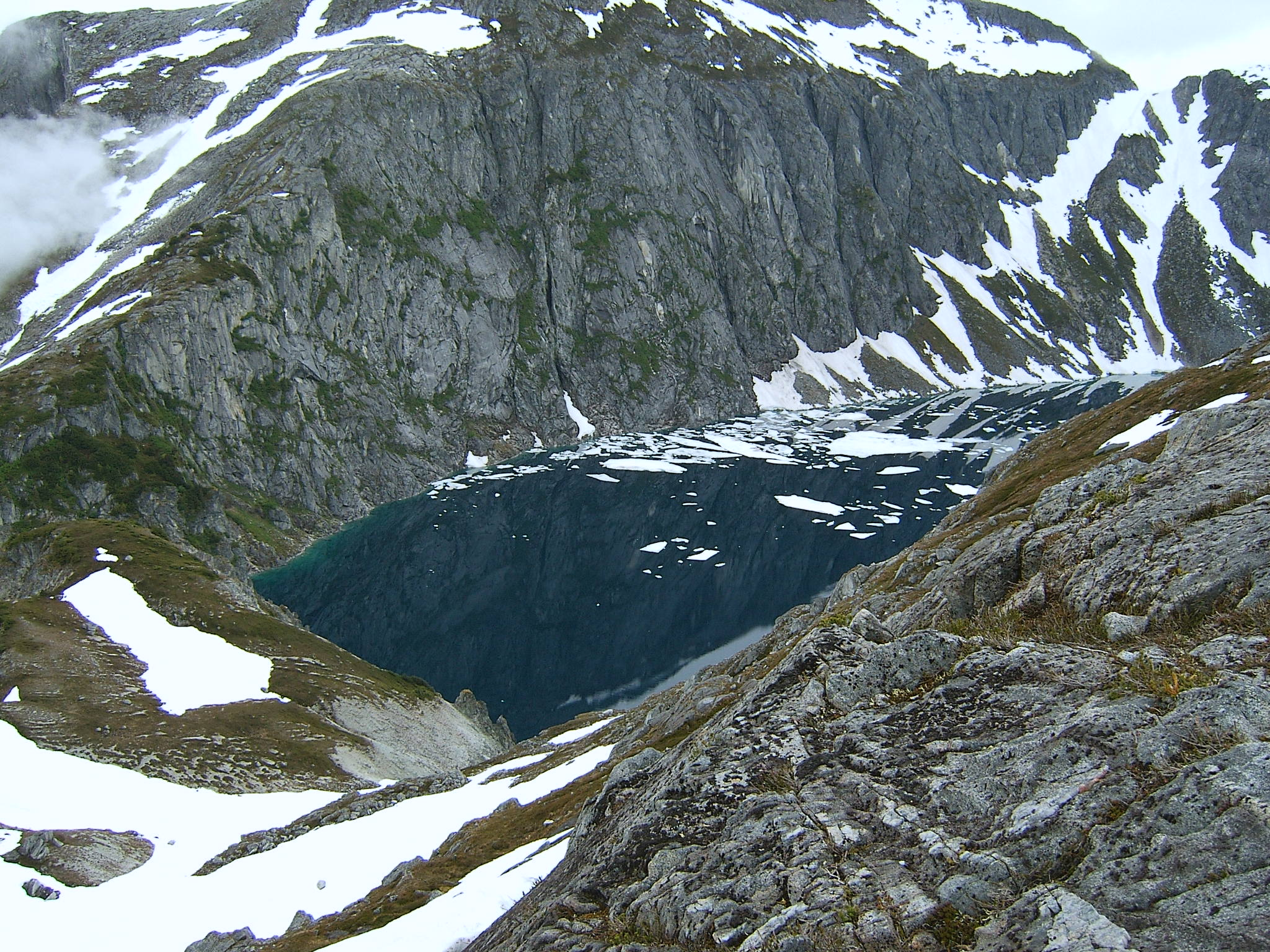
- Indigo Lake in mid-spring

- Location within Alaska
- Location: Baranof Island, Sitka City and Borough, Alaska, US
- Coordinates: 57°00′50″N 135°03′53″W
- Type: Glacial lake, tarn
- Basin countries: United States
- Max. length: 0.8 mi (1.3 km)
- Max. width: 0.5 mi (0.80 km)
- Surface elevation: 2,448 ft (746 m)

Indigo Lake or simply Indigo is a lake lying ten miles southeast of central Sitka, on the western coast of Baranof Island in the Alexander Archipelago of Alaska.

The name was reported in 1954 by local Sitkan Robert N. DeArmond to the USGS and was so named because its intensely and mysteriously indigo blue color. The lake about eight tenths of a mile across and long (a circular shape) with very steep and cliffed walls.

The southern ridge of Indigo Lake plays an important part in the trail to Peak 5390.
