= Indigo Airlines (American airline) =

American airline

IATA	ICAO	Call sign
I9	IBU	INDIGO BLUE
- Founded: 1997; 29 years ago
- Ceased operations: 2003; 23 years ago
- Headquarters: Chicago, Illinois, United States
- Key people: Matt Andersson; John N. Fenton; Tom Svrcek

Indigo Airlines was an American airline headquartered in Chicago, Illinois. It was the first business jet airline, founded in 1997 by Matt Andersson, John N. Fenton and Tom Svrcek. Its headquarters were first located in Chicago's Near North Side, and later at Chicago Midway Airport.

== History ==
It was the first airline to allow individual travelers to reserve and purchase a single seat on a traditional corporate or business jet, which then flew a "scheduled" flight like a traditional airline. Prior to Indigo the only business-jet service available to consumers consisted of jet ownership or charter, both expensive alternatives to regular airline travel. The company was the originator of two new categories of corporate jet air travel service: per seat, high frequency and the public or commercial corporate jet.

Indigo priced its service between its first city pair Chicago and New York City close to a so-called unrestricted coach class fare. The venture was backed by the American Express Corporation, which owned approximately 12% of Indigo's capital structure. Former American Express CEO Harvey Golub, now Chairman of Sentient Jet, led the Indigo investment and marketing agreement. According to its timetable, in 2001 Indigo was operating four roundtrip flights every weekday nonstop between Chicago Midway Airport (MDW) and Teterboro Airport (TEB) near New York City with Dassault Falcon 20 business jets.

Indigo's inventory was marketed and sold through American Express' Travel Related Services group and through its Platinum Card program. Indigo was the first business jet airline to list its seat inventory in the computer reservations systems Sabre and Apollo, using the carrier code "I9". The Indigo project was also supported by management consultants McKinsey & Company, and was advised by corporate identity firm Interbrand (an Omnicom company), public accountants and business advisors Arthur Anderson, public relations firm The Dilenschneider Group and investment bank and financial advisory firm Merrill Lynch & Company.

=== Fleet ===
Indigo's initial fleet consisted of four French-built Dassault Falcon 20 jets, fitted with leather seats, a galley, private bathroom and laptop power outlets. Indigo was headquartered in Chicago, Illinois at Chicago Midway International Airport in the former Ameritech corporate hangar facilities. This was a 220,000-square-foot (20,000 m^{2}) co-located hangar, office complex, private passenger terminal and maintenance facility.

Indigo was a vertically integrated aviation company and owned, employed and controlled its own aircraft fleet, pilots, dispatchers and maintenance services. The company operated as a Federal Aviation Administration FAR Part 135 commercial operator, and was certified by the United States Department of Transportation under Parts 41101 and 380 as a public charter operator. Indigo was the first business jet commercial operator to receive an additional DOT fitness approval and was granted a Certificate of Public Convenience and Necessity.

In its initial operations the company distributed a request for proposal to several aerospace manufacturers for a new regional business jet to eventually replace its initial aircraft. The Brazilian Embraer Legacy was a customized business jet version of the Embraer regional airline aircraft. Indigo was the first U.S. certified commercial operator of the Legacy and launched service with the then new stage 4 aircraft in 2003 in a 16-seat all business-class service. Former senior American Airlines executive and American Eagle President Peter Pappas was hired as manager, during the transition to broader regional jet service. Pappas, while at American, was responsible for the introduction of the Embraer regional jet in the American Eagle division.

=== Opposition to use of Teterboro Airport ===
Congressman Steven Rothman of New Jersey (D-NJ9) felt that Indigo represented unwelcome expansion at New Jersey's Teterboro Airport.

Other parties including Senator Jon Corzine (D-NJ) and Senator Frank Lautenberg (D-NJ) proposed to Department of Transportation Secretary Norman Mineta that Indigo's public charter flights required certain security services of the Teterboro Airport, part of a group of New York City metro airports operated by the Port Authority of New York and New Jersey, which it was not equipped to provide. The issue of multi-airport proprietor rules was also raised by the Congressmen.

Following involvement by Admiral James Loy, Transportation Security Administration (TSA) Administrator, legislation was subsequently signed by President Bush as part of an FAA Reauthorization Bill. Indigo and American Express management, as well as FAA administration, argued that Indigo's use of Teterboro was appropriate and preferable to local alternatives such as LaGuardia Airport or Newark Liberty International Airport which were designed and configured for large airline aircraft and to prohibit the company from accessing the airport was an unfair discrimination under federal airport funding criteria. By September 2003, Indigo halted all flights in and out of Teterboro Airport.

=== Competition ===
By 2004, Indigo had voluntarily idled its operations after difficulties in securing additional capitalization. In 2005 the Netjets company, backed by Warren Buffett's Berkshire Hathaway, announced its intention to begin scheduled business jet service between Chicago, New York and Los Angeles. Other companies entering the market include Geneva, Switzerland based Club Airways, started by World Economic Forum founders the Schwab family. Other notable ventures operating similar "per seat" inventory, distribution and pricing include the Dayjet company, Linear Air and various jet membership programs offering "shared per seat charter" services. Several North Atlantic services also directly applied the concept of a commercial corporate jet but in larger traditional airline aircraft and included MAXjet, Fly First Class, Eos and Silverjet. In 2008, a company called Greenjets began non-scheduled per-seat or shared-ride private jet service between major eastern US metropolitan markets. Greenjets, unlike Indigo, does not own or operate aircraft, but utilizes the jet charter fleet in the US.

== Publications ==
The original Indigo White Paper was titled "Redesigning the Traditional Airline Model" and published in the Spring 2000 edition of Institutional Investor's Journal of Private Equity. Indigo Founder and former CEO Matt Andersson also reviewed several of Indigo's broader aerospace, consumer and public policy initiatives in his book "The New Airline Code" published in 2005.

== See also ==
- List of defunct airlines of the United States
