= Indigo Lake (Ohio) =

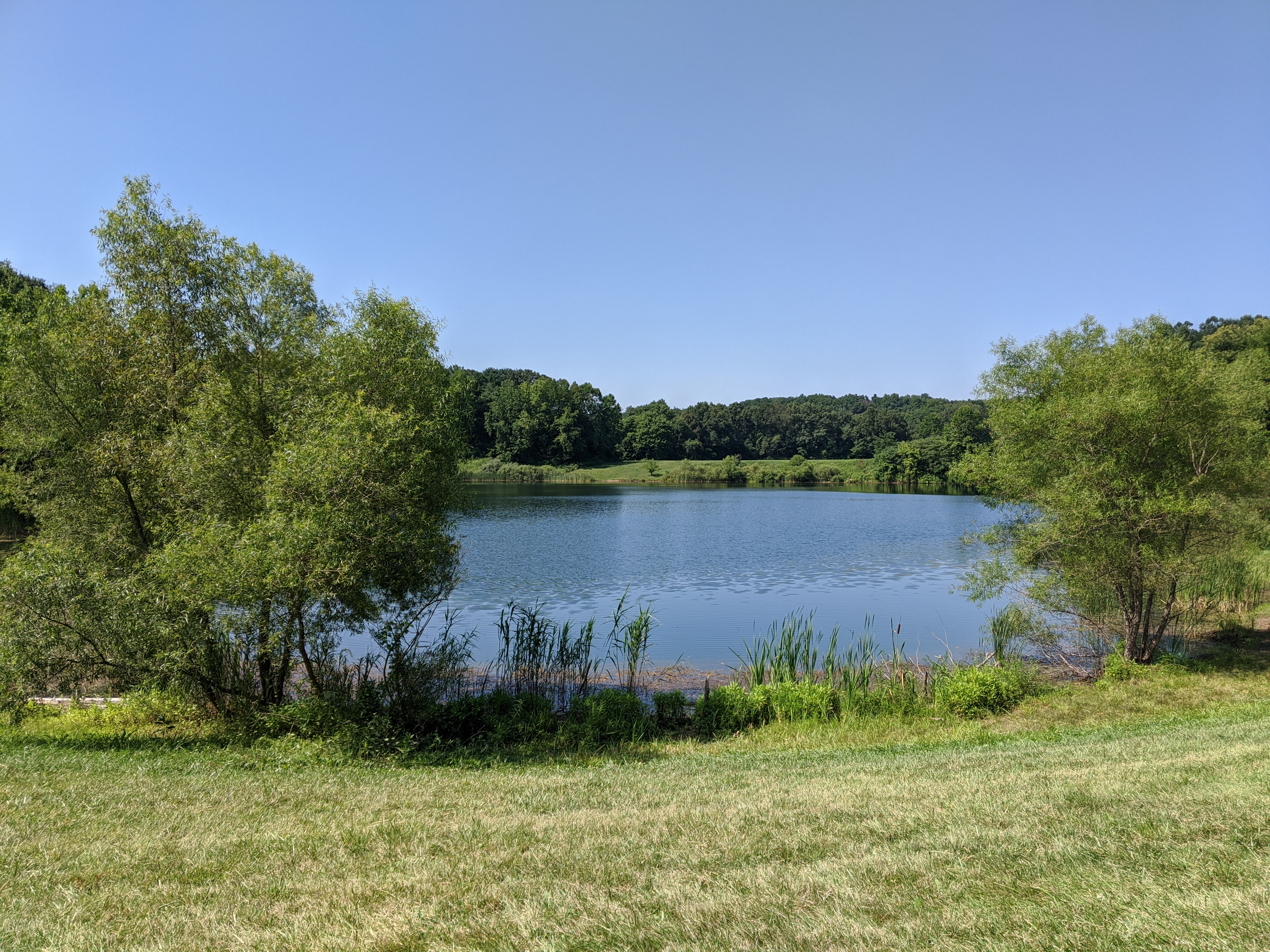
- Indigo Lake, Summer 2020

- Location within Ohio
- Location: Summit County, Ohio
- Coordinates: 41°11′35″N 81°34′54″W
- Type: lake
- Basin countries: United States
- Surface elevation: 728 ft (222 m)

Indigo Lake is a small, roughly triangular lake in Summit County, Ohio, in the United States. It is not a natural lake, having been created by the park service in Cuyahoga Valley National Park. It is a popular fishing location, with several species present including the largemouth bass.

== National Park ==
Originally the site of Gray's Quarry, a gravel and sand pit, Indigo Lake came under the responsibilities of the National Park Service on December 27, 1974, with the creation of the Cuyahoga Valley National Recreation Area. The pit was later filled with water by park service personnel to create what was subsequently called "Indigo Lake", which remains in place sustained by a constant supply of water from several natural springs in the immediate area. It is situated entirely within the boundaries of Cuyahoga Valley National Park.

It is one of only two places in the park closed to swimming. Although protected as part of the national park, the lake is a popular spot for local fishing. In addition, the lake, which normally freezes over in the colder months of the year, is used by the Akron Fire Department to practice under-ice rescue techniques each winter. It is accessible by car from Riverview road, on foot via the Ohio & Erie Canal Towpath Trail, and by rail via a flag stop station nearby at 41°11′39″N 81°34′45″W, part of the Cuyahoga Valley Scenic Railroad.

The lake is 722 feet (220 meters) above sea level and is 89 feet at the deepest point.
