= Indigo Internet =

Indigo Internet was established in late 1995 as an Internet service provider in Dublin, Ireland. It was founded by members of the Moyna family. Indigo was claimed to have over 16,000 subscribers in Ireland, though others questioned the validity and accuracy of these user numbers. It was purchased by Telecom Éireann (now eir) in 1997, and no longer operates as a separate entity.

== History ==
Indigo Internet was launched in early 1996 by members of the Moyna family.

Shortly afterwards, the company was the subject to an article in Computimes, a special section on computing run once a week by the Irish Times, about a security breach in their system. This story, due to the interest in the development of the internet, made the front page of the Irish Times. Indigo had reportedly placed a file containing what was believed to be most if not all of their users usernames and encrypted passwords into a public file download area. The file was acquired by Computimes staff and opened to expose the security content.

Questions about the sources of funding for the original startup were highlighted by incidents such as the news that a man who US Federal officials said was a member of the Irish Republican Army was being held on charges of carrying $13,500 in counterfeit $50 bills at LaGuardia Airport, when arrested. The suspect, Donal Patrick Moyna, then 29 years old, of Dublin, was about to board a plane for Providence, R.I., when he was stopped by agents of the U.S. Secret Service and the Federal Bureau of Investigation. However, even though he was caught "red" handed, he was released by the U.S. authorities and allowed to leave their country.

The questions surrounding the funding and family associations were reputedly one of the reasons the family sold the business to a consortium of investors, including Shay Moran, in the mid 1990s. In the late 1990s, it was announced that the national telephone company, Telecom Éireann, saw an opportunity to enter the ISP market and made an offer for Indigo. This offer was accepted by the then owners/investors, and Indigo was acquired by Telecom Éireann in 1997.

Indigo effectively no longer exists as all of its activities have been subsumed into Eir (formerly Eircom and, before that, Telecom Éireann). The Indigo website now simply points to Eircom services.

== See also ==
- List of Irish companies
