= Thiolate-protected gold cluster =

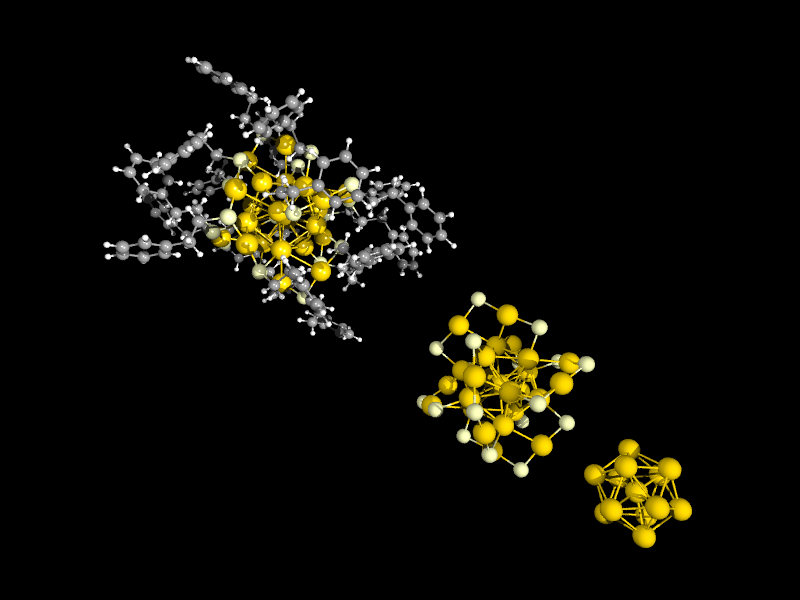
Structure of Au_{25}R_{18}-,(R=SCH_{2}Ph, white: H, grey: C, dull yellow :S, yellow: Au) single crystal X-ray diffractometry. Top left: full structure; middle : only gold core and Au-S shell displayed, bottom right: only Au_{13}-core displayed

Thiolate-protected gold clusters are a type of ligand-protected metal cluster, synthesized from gold ions and thin layer compounds that play a special role in cluster physics because of their unique stability and electronic properties. They are considered to be stable compounds.

These clusters can range in size up to hundreds of gold atoms, above which they are classified as passivated gold nanoparticles.

== Synthesis ==
=== Wet chemical synthesis ===
The wet chemical synthesis of thiolate-protected gold clusters is achieved by the reduction of gold(III) salt solutions, using a mild reducing agent in the presence of thiol compounds. This method starts with gold ions and synthesizes larger particles from them, therefore this type of synthesis can be regarded as a "bottom-up approach" in nanotechnology to the synthesis of nanoparticles.

The reduction process depends on the equilibrium between different oxidation states of the gold and the oxidized or reduced forms of the reducing agent, or thiols. Gold(I)-thiolate polymers have been identified as important in the initial steps of the reaction. Several synthesis recipes exist that are similar to the Brust synthesis of colloidal gold, however the mechanism is not yet fully understood. The synthesis produces a mixture of dissolved, thiolate-protected gold clusters of different sizes. These particles can then be separated by gel electrophoresis (PAGE). If the synthesis is performed in a kinetically controlled manner, particularly stable representatives can be obtained with particles of uniform size (monodispersely), avoiding further separation steps.

=== Template-mediated synthesis ===
Rather than starting from "naked" gold ions in solution, template reactions can be used for directed synthesis of clusters. The high affinity of the gold ions to electronegative and (partially) charged atoms of functional groups yields potential seeds for cluster formation. The interface between the metal and the template can act as a stabilizer and steer the final size of the cluster. Some potential templates are dendrimers, oligonucleotides, proteins, polyelectrolytes and polymers.

=== Etching synthesis ===
Top-down synthesis of the clusters can be achieved by the "etching" of larger metallic nanoparticles with redox-active, thiol-containing biomolecules. In this process, gold atoms on the nanoparticles' surface react with the thiol, dissolving as gold-thiolate complexes until the dissolution reaction stops; this leaves behind a residual species of thiolate-protected gold clusters that is particularly stable. This type of synthesis is also possible using other non thiol-based ligands.

== Properties ==
=== Electronic and optical properties ===
The electronic structure of the thiolate-protected gold clusters is characterized by strongly pronounced quantum effects. These result in discrete electronic states, and a nonzero HOMO–LUMO gap. This existence of discrete electronic states was first indicated by the discrepancy between their optical absorption and the predictions of classical Mie scattering. The discrete optical transitions and occurrence of photoluminescence in these species are areas where they behave like molecular, rather than metallic, substances. This molecular optical behavior sharply distinguishes thiolate-protected clusters from gold nanoparticles, whose optical characteristics are driven by Plasmon resonance. Some of thiolate-protected clusters' properties can be described using a model in which the clusters are treated like "superatoms". According to this model they exhibit atomic-like electronic states, that are labeled S, P, D, F according to their respective angular momentum on the atomic level. Those clusters that have a "closed superatomic shell" configuration have indeed been identified as the most stable ones. This electronic shell closure and the resulting gain in stability is responsible for the discrete distribution of a few stable cluster sizes (magic numbers) observed in their synthesis, rather than a quasi-continuous distribution of sizes.

=== Magic numbers ===
Magic numbers are connected with the number of metal atoms in those thiolate-protected clusters which display an outstanding stability. Such clusters can be synthesized monodispersely and are end products of the etching procedure after an addition of excess thiols does not lead to further metal dissolution. Some important clusters with magic numbers are (SG:Glutathione): Au_{10}(SG)_{10}, Au_{15}(SG)_{13}, Au_{18}(SG)_{14}, Au_{22}(SG)_{16}, Au_{22}(SG)_{17}, Au_{25}(SG)_{18}, Au_{29}(SG)_{20}, Au_{33}(SG)_{22}, and Au_{39}(SG)_{24}.

Au_{20}(SCH_{2}Ph)_{16} is also well-known. It was greater than representatives Au_{102}(p-MBA)_{44} with the para-mercaptobenzoice (para-mercapto-benzoic acid, p-MBA) produced ligand.

== Structure prediction ==
Worthy of note is that in 2013, a structural prediction of the Au_{130} (SCH_{3})_{50} cluster, based on Density Functional Theory (DFT) was confirmed in 2015. This result represents the maturity of this field where calculations are able to guide the experimental work. The following table features some sizes.

== Composition database ==
| Composition | Mass Spec. | Crystal Structure | DFT models | Exp. UV-Vis | Exp. powder XRD |
|---|---|---|---|---|---|
| Au_{10}(SR)_{10} | JACS 2005 | JACS 2000 | - | Example | Example |
| Au_{15}(SR)_{13} | JACS 2005 | Not known | JACS 2013, PCCP 2013 | JACS 2005 | |
| Au_{18}(SR)_{14} | | Angew. Chem Int. Ed. 2015, Angew. Chem Int. Ed. 2015 | PCCP 2012 | | |
| Au_{24}(SR)_{20} | JPCL 2010 | Nanoscale 2014 | JACS 2012 | JPCL 2010 | |
| Au_{40}(SR)_{24} | JACS 2010 Nano Lett 2015 | Sci Adv 2015 | JACS 2012 Nanoscale 2013 Sci Adv 2015 | Anal. Chem. 2013 Nano Lett 2015 | |
| Au_{130}(SR)_{50} | | | J. Phys. Chem. A 2013 | | |
| Au_{187}(SR)_{68} | | not known | PCCP 2015 | | |

== Applications ==
In bionanotechnology, intrinsic properties of the clusters (for example, fluorescence) can be made available for bionanotechnological applications by linking them with biomolecules through the process of bioconjugation. The protected gold particles' stability and fluorescence makes them efficient emitters of electromagnetic radiation that can be tuned by varying the cluster size and the type of ligand used for protection. The protective shell can function (have functional groups added) in a way that selective binding (for example, as a complementary protein receptor of DNA-DNA-interaction) qualifies them for the use as biosensors.
