= Heterometallic copper-aluminum superatom =

Identifiers
3D model (JSmol)	ansolvate: Interactive image; •3C_{6}H_{6}: Interactive image; •6C_{6}H_{6}: Interactive image
- InChI: ansolvate: InChI=1S/12C10H15.12Al.43Cu/c12*1-6-7(2)9(4)10(5)8(6)3;;;;;;;;;;;;;;;;;;;;;;;;;;;;;;;;;;;;;;;;;;;;;;;;;;;;;;;/h12*1-5H3;;;;;;;;;;;;;;;;;;;;;;;;;;;;;;;;;;;;;;;;;;;;;;;;;;;;;;;/q12*-1;12*+1;;;;;;;;;;;;;;;;;;;;;;;;;;;;;;;;;;;;;;;;;;; Key: XZRCOZCTSKJEJT-UHFFFAOYSA-N
- SMILES: ansolvate: [Al+].[Al+].[Al+].[Al+].[Al+].[Al+].[Al+].[Al+].[Al+].[Al+].[Al+].[Al+].CC1=C(C)[C-](C)C(C)=C1C.CC1=C(C)[C-](C)C(C)=C1C.CC1=C(C)[C-](C)C(C)=C1C.CC1=C(C)[C-](C)C(C)=C1C.CC1=C(C)[C-](C)C(C)=C1C.CC1=C(C)[C-](C)C(C)=C1C.CC1=C(C)[C-](C)C(C)=C1C.CC1=C(C)[C-](C)C(C)=C1C.CC1=C(C)[C-](C)C(C)=C1C.CC1=C(C)[C-](C)C(C)=C1C.CC1=C(C)[C-](C)C(C)=C1C.CC1=C(C)[C-](C)C(C)=C1C.[Cu].[Cu].[Cu].[Cu].[Cu].[Cu].[Cu].[Cu].[Cu].[Cu].[Cu].[Cu].[Cu].[Cu].[Cu].[Cu].[Cu].[Cu].[Cu].[Cu].[Cu].[Cu].[Cu].[Cu].[Cu].[Cu].[Cu].[Cu].[Cu].[Cu].[Cu].[Cu].[Cu].[Cu].[Cu].[Cu].[Cu].[Cu].[Cu].[Cu].[Cu].[Cu].[Cu]; •3C_{6}H_{6}: c1ccccc1.c1ccccc1.c1ccccc1.[Al+].[Al+].[Al+].[Al+].[Al+].[Al+].[Al+].[Al+].[Al+].[Al+].[Al+].[Al+].CC1=C(C)[C-](C)C(C)=C1C.CC1=C(C)[C-](C)C(C)=C1C.CC1=C(C)[C-](C)C(C)=C1C.CC1=C(C)[C-](C)C(C)=C1C.CC1=C(C)[C-](C)C(C)=C1C.CC1=C(C)[C-](C)C(C)=C1C.CC1=C(C)[C-](C)C(C)=C1C.CC1=C(C)[C-](C)C(C)=C1C.CC1=C(C)[C-](C)C(C)=C1C.CC1=C(C)[C-](C)C(C)=C1C.CC1=C(C)[C-](C)C(C)=C1C.CC1=C(C)[C-](C)C(C)=C1C.[Cu].[Cu].[Cu].[Cu].[Cu].[Cu].[Cu].[Cu].[Cu].[Cu].[Cu].[Cu].[Cu].[Cu].[Cu].[Cu].[Cu].[Cu].[Cu].[Cu].[Cu].[Cu].[Cu].[Cu].[Cu].[Cu].[Cu].[Cu].[Cu].[Cu].[Cu].[Cu].[Cu].[Cu].[Cu].[Cu].[Cu].[Cu].[Cu].[Cu].[Cu].[Cu].[Cu]; •6C_{6}H_{6}: c1ccccc1.c1ccccc1.c1ccccc1.c1ccccc1.c1ccccc1.c1ccccc1.[Al+].[Al+].[Al+].[Al+].[Al+].[Al+].[Al+].[Al+].[Al+].[Al+].[Al+].[Al+].CC1=C(C)[C-](C)C(C)=C1C.CC1=C(C)[C-](C)C(C)=C1C.CC1=C(C)[C-](C)C(C)=C1C.CC1=C(C)[C-](C)C(C)=C1C.CC1=C(C)[C-](C)C(C)=C1C.CC1=C(C)[C-](C)C(C)=C1C.CC1=C(C)[C-](C)C(C)=C1C.CC1=C(C)[C-](C)C(C)=C1C.CC1=C(C)[C-](C)C(C)=C1C.CC1=C(C)[C-](C)C(C)=C1C.CC1=C(C)[C-](C)C(C)=C1C.CC1=C(C)[C-](C)C(C)=C1C.[Cu].[Cu].[Cu].[Cu].[Cu].[Cu].[Cu].[Cu].[Cu].[Cu].[Cu].[Cu].[Cu].[Cu].[Cu].[Cu].[Cu].[Cu].[Cu].[Cu].[Cu].[Cu].[Cu].[Cu].[Cu].[Cu].[Cu].[Cu].[Cu].[Cu].[Cu].[Cu].[Cu].[Cu].[Cu].[Cu].[Cu].[Cu].[Cu].[Cu].[Cu].[Cu].[Cu]

Properties
Chemical formula	C_{120}H_{180}Al_{12}Cu_{43}
Molar mass	4679.016 g·mol^{−1}
Appearance	Black crystals
Solubility	Insoluble in benzene

Structure
Crystal structure	cubic
Space group	Im-3
Lattice constant	a = 20.2549 Å at 101 K
Lattice volume (V)	8309.8 Å^{3}
Formula units (Z)	2
- Except where otherwise noted, data are given for materials in their standard state (at 25 °C [77 °F], 100 kPa). Infobox references

The heterometallic copper-aluminum superatom is a Mackay‐type icosahedral cluster compound with formula [Cu_{43}Al_{12}](Cp*)_{12}. It is an open‐shell 67‐electron superatom. It is notable for its large electron count compared to other heterometallic superatoms and its unprecedented electron structure of an open-shell configuration. As of 2018, it was the largest heterometallic superatom to be created using wet chemical synthesis.

== Synthesis ==
Combining (pentamethylcyclopentadienyl)aluminium(I) with mesitylcopper(I) in benzene at 78 °C under an inert atmosphere for 48 hours, followed by slow cooling, forms black cocrystals of the compound with benzene:

[AlCp*]_{4} + [CuMes]_{5} + C_{6}H_{6} → [Cu_{43}Al_{12}](Cp*)_{12}·6C_{6}H_{6}

The material is created from single-atom sources of copper and aluminium, which spontaneously separate from the organic compounds to form the superatom cluster. The exergonic nature of the reaction demonstrates that this specific arrangement of copper and aluminum atoms is stable.

== Structure ==
According to crystallographic and computational analysis, the complex contains a central copper atom surrounded by a first icosahedral shell containing twelve copper atoms, followed by a second icosahedral shell containing twelve aluminium atoms (located at the vertices of the icosahedron) and thirty copper atoms (located at the midpoints of the edges). This central group of metal atoms (of radius 5.137 Å) is surrounded by twelve pentamethylcyclopentadienyl ligands (one attached to each aluminium atom) that assist in protecting it against further reaction. It was the first ligated heterometallic Mackay-type cluster to be discovered.
