= Superatom =

Atom cluster that exhibits properties of elemental atoms

In chemistry, a superatom is any cluster of atoms that seem to exhibit some of the properties of elemental atoms. One example of a superatom is the cluster Al_{13}^{−}.

Sodium atoms, when cooled from vapor, naturally condense into clusters, preferentially containing a magic number of atoms (2, 8, 20, 40, 58, etc.), with the outermost electron of each atom entering an orbital encompassing all the atoms in the cluster. Superatoms tend to behave chemically in a way that will allow them to have a closed shell of electrons, in this new counting scheme.

== Superhalogens ==
Superhalogens are atom clusters with a higher electron affinity than chlorine, the atom with the highest electron affinity (3.62 eV). The concept was first formalized by Gennady L. Gutsev and Alexander I. Boldyrev in 1981. They were first clearly experimentally identified in 1999, precipitating a wave of subsequent research in the field.

== Superalkalis ==
Superalkalis are atom clusters with a lower ionization energy than caesium, the atom with the lowest ionization energy (3.89 eV). The concept was first formalized by Gutsev and Boldryev in 1982.

== Aluminium clusters ==
Certain aluminium clusters have superatom properties. These aluminium clusters are generated as anions (Al^{−}_{n} with n = 1, 2, 3, … ) in helium gas and reacted with a gas containing iodine. When analyzed by mass spectrometry one main reaction product turns out to be Al_{13}I^{−}. These clusters of 13 aluminium atoms with an extra electron added do not appear to react with oxygen when it is introduced in the same gas stream, indicating a halide-like character and a magic number of 40 free electrons. Such a cluster is known as a superhalogen. The cluster component in Al_{13}I^{−} ion is similar to an iodide ion or better still a bromide ion. The related Al_{13}I^{−}_{2} cluster is expected to behave chemically like the triiodide ion.

Similarly it has been noted that Al_{14} clusters with 42 electrons (2 more than the magic numbers) appear to exhibit the properties of an alkaline earth metal which typically adopt +2 valence states. This is only known to occur when there are at least 3 iodine atoms attached to an Al^{−}_{14} cluster, Al_{14}I^{−}_{3}. The anionic cluster has a total of 43 itinerant electrons, but the three iodine atoms each remove one of the itinerant electrons to leave 40 electrons in the jellium shell.

It is particularly easy and reliable to study atomic clusters of inert gas atoms by computer simulation because interaction between two atoms can be approximated very well by the Lennard-Jones potential. Other methods are readily available and it has been established that the magic numbers are 13, 19, 23, 26, 29, 32, 34, 43, 46, 49, 55, etc.

- Al_{7} = the property is similar to germanium atoms.
- Al_{13} = the property is similar to halogen atoms, more specifically, chlorine.
  - Al_{13}I^{−}_{x}, where x = 1–13.
- Al_{14} = the property is similar to alkaline earth metals.
  - Al_{14}I^{−}_{x}, where x = 1–14.
- Al_{23}
- Al_{37}
- Al_{5}O^{−}_{4}

== Other clusters ==
- Li(HF)_{3}Li = the (HF)_{3} interior causes 2 valence electrons from the Li to orbit the entire molecule as if it were an atom's nucleus.
- Li(NH_{3})_{4} = has one diffuse electron orbiting around Li(NH_{3})^{+}_{4} core, i.e., mimics an alkali-metal atom.
- Be(NH_{3})_{4} = has two diffuse electrons orbiting around Be(NH_{3})^{2+}_{4} core, i.e., mimics He-atom.
- VSi_{16}F = has ionic bonding.
- A cluster of 13 platinum atoms becomes highly paramagnetic, much more so than platinum itself.

== Superatom complexes ==
Superatom complexes are a special group of superatoms that incorporate a metal core which is stabilized by organic ligands. In thiolate-protected gold cluster complexes, a simple electron counting rule can be used to determine the total number of electrons (n_{e}) which correspond to a magic number:

$$n_e = N\nu_A - M -z$$

where N is the number of metal atoms (A) in the core, v is the atomic valence, M is the number of electron withdrawing ligands, and z is the overall charge on the complex. For example the Au_{102}(p-MBA)_{44} has 58 electrons and corresponds to a closed shell magic number.

=== Gold superatom complexes ===
- Au_{25}(SMe)^{−}_{18}
- Au_{102}(p-MBA)_{44}
- Au_{144}(SR)_{60}

=== Other superatom complexes ===
- Ga_{23}(N(Si(CH_{3})_{3})_{2})_{11}
- Al_{50}(C_{5}(CH_{3})_{5})_{12}
- Re_{6}Se_{8}Cl_{2} – In 2018 researchers produced 15-nm-thick flakes of this superatomic material. They anticipate that a monolayer will be a superatomic 2-D semiconductor and offer new 2-D materials with unusual, tunable properties.
- Organo− Zintl-based superatoms: [Ge_{9}(CHO)_{3}] and [Ge_{9}(CHO)]
- [Cu_{43}Al_{12}](Cp*)_{12}

== See also ==
- Bose–Einstein condensate
- Catenation
- Metal aromaticity
- Quantum dot
