= Nanomaterial-based catalyst =

Nanoparticle catalysts

A nanomaterial-based catalyst, also known as nanocatalyst, is usually a heterogeneous catalyst based upon metal nanoparticles. Metal nanoparticles have high surface area, which can increase catalytic activity. Nanoparticle catalysts can be easily separated and recycled. They are typically used under mild conditions to prevent decomposition or agglomeration of the nanoparticles. In many cases they are supported on substrates, sometimes they are not.

== Functionalized nanoparticles ==
Functionalized metal nanoparticles are more stable toward solvents compared to non-functionalized metal nanoparticles. In liquids, the metal nanoparticles can be affected by van der Waals force. Particle aggregation can sometimes decrease catalytic activity by lowering the surface area. Nanoparticles can also be functionalized with polymers or oligomers to sterically stabilize the nanoparticles by providing a protective layer that prevents the nanoparticles from interacting with each other. Alloys of two metals, called bimetallic nanoparticles, are used to create synergistic effects on catalysis between the two metals.

== Potential applications ==
=== Dehalogenation and hydrogenation ===
Nanoparticle catalysts are active for the hydrogenolysis of C-Cl bonds such as polychlorinated biphenyls. Another reaction is hydrogenation of halogenated aromatic amines is also important for the synthesis of herbicides and pesticides as well as diesel fuel. In organic chemistry, hydrogenation of a C-Cl bond with deuterium is used to selectively label the aromatic ring for use in experiments dealing with the kinetic isotope effect. Buil et al. created rhodium complexes that generated rhodium nanoparticles. These nanoparticles catalyzed the dehalogenation of aromatic compounds as well as the hydrogenation of benzene to cyclohexane. Polymer-stabilized nanoparticles can also be used for the hydrogenation of cinnamaldehyde and citronellal. Yu et al. found that the ruthenium nanocatalysts are more selective in the hydrogenation of citronellal compared to the traditional catalysts used.

=== Hydrosilylation reactions ===
Hydrosilylation reaction

The Reduction of gold, cobalt, nickel, palladium, or platinum organometallic complexes with silanes produces metal nanoparticle that catalyze the hydrosilylation reaction. BINAP-functionalized palladium nanoparticles and gold nanoparticles have been used for the hydrosilylaytion of styrene under mild conditions; they were found to be more catalytically active and more stable than non-nanoparticle Pd-BINAP complexes. The reaction may also be catalyzed by a nanoparticle that consists of two metals.

=== Organic redox reactions ===
Oxidation reaction of cyclohexane to synthesize adiapic acid

An oxidation reaction to form adipic acid is shown in figure 3 and it can be catalyzed by cobalt nanoparticles. This is used in an industrial scale to produce the nylon 6,6 polymer. Other examples of oxidation reactions that are catalyzed by metallic nanoparticles include the oxidation of cyclooctane, the oxidation of ethene, and glucose oxidation.

=== C-C coupling reactions ===
Heck coupling reaction

Metallic nanoparticles can catalyze C–C coupling reactions such as the hydroformylation of olefins, the synthesis of vitamin E and the Heck coupling and Suzuki coupling reactions.

Palladium nanoparticles were found to efficiently catalyze Heck coupling reactions. It was found that increased electronegativity of the ligands on the palladium nanoparticles increased their catalytic activity.

The compound Pd_{2}(dba)_{3} is a source of Pd(0), which is the catalytically active source of palladium used for many reactions, including cross coupling reactions. Pd2(dba)3 was thought to be a homogeneous catalytic precursor, but recent articles suggest that palladium nanoparticles are formed, making it a heterogeneous catalytic precursor.

=== Alternative fuels ===
Iron oxide and cobalt nanoparticles can be loaded onto various surface active materials like alumina to convert gases such as carbon monoxide and hydrogen into liquid hydrocarbon fuels using the Fischer-Tropsch process.

Much research on nanomaterial-based catalysts has to do with maximizing the effectiveness of the catalyst coating in fuel cells. Platinum is currently the most common catalyst for this application, however, it is expensive and rare, so a lot of research has been going into maximizing the catalytic properties of other metals by shrinking them to nanoparticles in the hope that someday they will be an efficient and economic alternative to platinum. Gold nanoparticles also exhibit catalytic properties, despite the fact that bulk gold is unreactive.

Yttrium stabilized zirconium nanoparticles were found to increase the efficiency and reliability of a solid oxide fuel cell. Nanomaterial ruthenium/platinum catalysts could potentially be used to catalyze the purification of hydrogen for hydrogen storage. Palladium nanoparticles can be functionalized with organometallic ligands to catalyze the oxidation of CO and NO to control air pollution in the environment. Carbon nanotube supported catalysts can be used as a cathode catalytic support for fuel cells and metal nanoparticles have been used to catalyze the growth of carbon nanotubes. Platinum-cobalt bimetallic nanoparticles combined with carbon nanotubes are promising candidates for direct methanol fuel cells since they produce a higher stable current electrode.

=== Medicine ===
In magnetic chemistry, nanoparticles can be used for catalyst support for medicinal use.

=== Nanozymes ===
Besides conventional catalysis, nanomaterials have been explored for mimicking natural enzymes. The nanomaterials with enzyme mimicking activities are termed as nanozymes. Many nanomaterials have been used to mimic varieties of natural enzymes, such as oxidase, peroxidase, catalase, SOD, nuclease, etc. The nanozymes have found wide applications in many areas, from biosensing and bioimaging to therapeutics and water treatment.

== Nanostructures for electrocatalysis ==
Nanocatalysts are of wide interest in fuel cells and electrolyzers, where the catalyst strongly affects efficiency.

=== Nanoporous surfaces ===
In fuel cells, nanoporous materials are widely used to make cathodes. Porous nanoparticles of platinum have good activity in nanocatalysis but are less stable and their lifetime is short.

=== Nanoparticles ===
One drawback to the use of nanoparticles is their tendency to agglomerate. The problem can be mitigated with the correct catalyst support. Nanoparticles are optimal structures to be used as nanosensors because they can be tuned to detect specific molecules. Examples of Pd nanoparticles electrodeposited on multi-walled carbon nanotubes have shown good activity towards catalysis of cross-coupling reactions.

=== Nanowires ===
Nanowires are very interesting for electrocatalytic purpose because they are easier to produce and the control over their characteristics in the production process is quite precise. Also, nanowires can increase faradaic efficiency due to their spatial extent and thus to greater availability of reactants on the active surface.

=== Materials ===
The nanostructures involved in electrocatalysis processes can be made up of different materials. Through the use of nanostructured materials, electrocatalysts can achieve good physical-chemical stability, high activity, good conductivity and low cost. Metallic nanomaterials are commonly made up of transition metals (mostly iron, cobalt, nickel, palladium, platinum). Multi-metal nanomaterials show new properties due to the characteristics of each metal. The advantages are the increase in activity, selectivity and stability and the cost reduction. Metals can be combined in different ways such as in the core-shell bimetallic structure: the cheapest metal forms the core and the most active one (typically a noble metal) constitutes the shell. By adopting this design, the use of rare and expensive metals can be reduced down to 20%.

One of the future challenges is to find new stable materials, with good activity and especially low cost. Metallic glasses, polymeric carbon nitride (PCN) and materials derived from metal-organic frameworks (MOF) are just a few examples of materials with electrocatalytic properties on which research is currently investing.

== Photocatalysis ==
Many of the photocatalytic systems can benefit from the coupling with a noble metal; the first Fujishima-Honda cell made use of a co-catalyst plate as well. For instance, the essential design of a disperse photocatalytic reactor for water splitting is that of a water sol in which the dispersed phase is made up of semiconductor quantum dots each coupled to a metallic co-catalyst: the QD converts the incoming electromagnetic radiation into an exciton whilst the co-catalyst acts as an electron scavenger and lowers the overpotential of the electrochemical reaction.

== Characterization of nanoparticles ==
Some techniques that can be used to characterize functionalized nanomaterial catalysts include X-ray photoelectron spectroscopy, transmission electron microscopy, circular dichroism spectroscopy, nuclear magnetic resonance spectroscopy, UV-visible spectroscopy and related experiments.

== See also ==
- Nanomaterials
- Nanotechnology
- Transition metal
- Quantum dot
- Platinum nanoparticles
- Icosahedral twins
- Nanozymes
