= Platinum nanoparticle =

Platinum nanoparticles are usually in the form of a suspension or colloid of nanoparticles of platinum in a fluid, usually water. A colloid is technically defined as a stable dispersion of particles in a fluid medium (liquid or gas).

Spherical platinum nanoparticles can be made with sizes between about 2 and 100 nanometres (nm), depending on reaction conditions. Platinum nanoparticles are suspended in the colloidal solution of brownish-red or black color. Nanoparticles come in wide variety of shapes including spheres, rods, cubes, and tetrahedra.

Platinum nanoparticles are the subject of substantial research, with potential applications in a wide variety of areas. These include catalysis, medicine, and the synthesis of novel materials with unique properties.

== Synthesis ==
Platinum nanoparticles are typically synthesized either by the reduction of platinum ion precursors in solution with a stabilizing or capping agent to form colloidal nanoparticles, or by the impregnation and reduction of platinum ion precursors in a micro-porous support such as alumina.

Some common examples of platinum precursors include potassium hexachloroplatinate (K_{2}PtCl_{6}) or platinous chloride (PtCl_{2}) Different combinations of precursors, such as ruthenium chloride (RuCl_{3}) and chloroplatinic acid (H_{2}PtCl_{6}), have been used to synthesize mixed-metal nanoparticles Some common examples of reducing agents include hydrogen gas (H_{2}), sodium borohydride (NaBH_{4}) and ethylene glycol (C_{2}H_{6}O_{2}), although other alcohols and plant-derived compounds have also been used.

As the platinum metal precursor is reduced to neutral platinum metal (Pt^{0}), the reaction mixture becomes supersaturated with platinum metal and the Pt^{0} begins to precipitate in the form of nanoscale particles. A capping agent or stabilizing agent such as sodium polyacrylic acid or sodium citrate is often used to stabilize the nanoparticle surfaces, and prevents the aggregation and coalescence of the nanoparticles.

The size of nanoparticles synthesized colloidally may be controlled by changing the platinum precursor, the ratio of capping agent to precursor, and/or the reaction temperature. The size of the nanoparticles can also be controlled with small deviation by using a stepwise seed-mediated growth procedure as outlined by Bigall et al. (2008). The size of nanoparticles synthesized onto a substrate such as alumina depends on various parameters such as the pore size of the support.

Platinum nanoparticles can also be synthesized by decomposing Pt_{2}(dba)_{3} (dba = dibenzylideneacetone) under a CO or H_{2} atmosphere, in the presence of a capping agent. The size and shape distributions of the resulting nanoparticles depend on the solvent, the reaction atmosphere, the types of capping agents and their relative concentrations, the specific platinum ion precursor, as well at the temperature of the system and reaction time.

=== Shape and size control ===
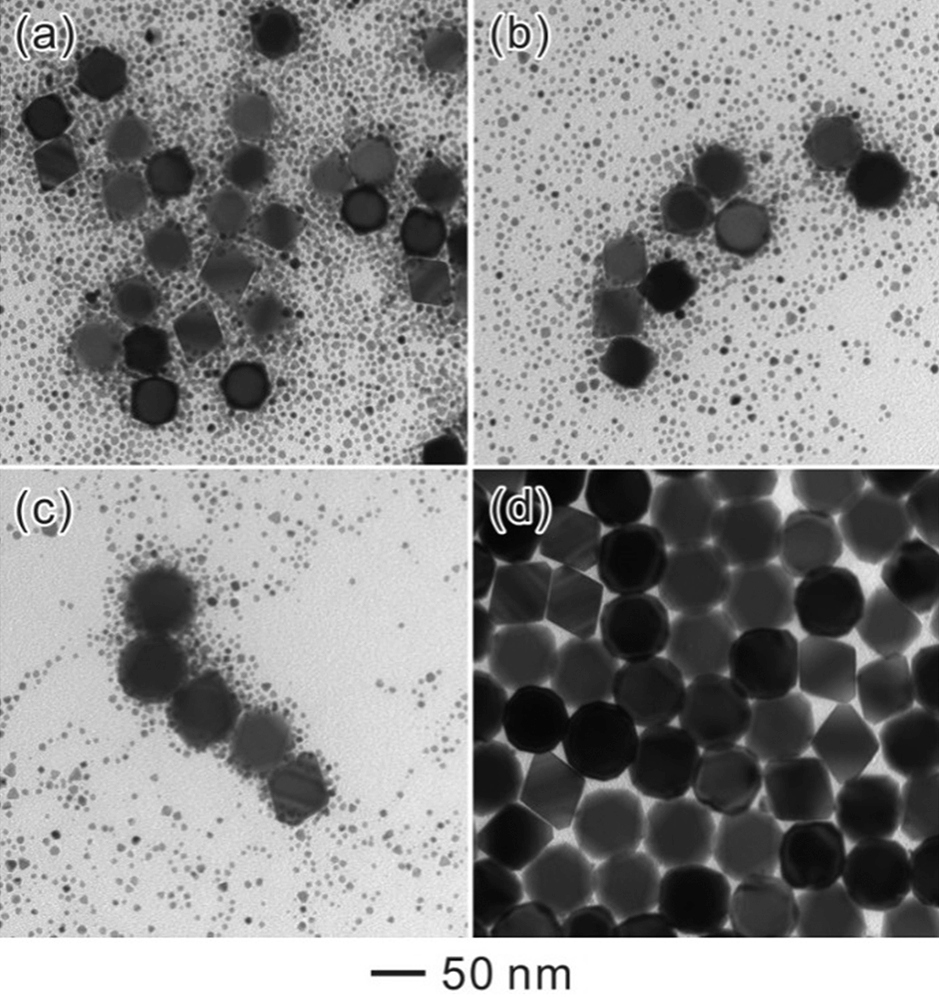
Electron micrographs of Ostwald ripening in Pd nanoparticles dissolved in formaldehyde at 6 (a), 24 (b), 48 (c) and 72 hours (d). The small Pd particles are being consumed as the larger ones grow bigger.

Ramirez et al. reported the influence of ligand and solvent effects on the size and shape of platinum nanoparticles. Platinum nanoparticle seeds were prepared by the decomposition of Pt_{2}(dba)_{3} in tetrahydrofuran (THF) under carbon monoxide (CO). These conditions produced Pt nanoparticles with weakly bound THF and CO ligands and an approximate diameter on 1.2 nm. Hexadecylamine (HDA) was added to the purified reaction mixture and allowed to displace the THF and CO ligands over the course of approximately seven days, producing monodispersed spherical crystalline Pt nanoparticles with an average diameter of 2.1 nm. After the seven-day period, an elongation of the Pt nanoparticles occurred. When the same procedure was followed using a stronger capping agent such as triphenyl phosphine or octanethiol, the nanoparticles remained spherical, suggesting that the HDA ligand affects particle shape.

Oleylamine, oleic acid and platinum(II) acetylacetonate (Pt(acac)_{2}) are also used in the synthesis of size/shape controlled platinum nanoparticles. Research showed that alkylamine can coordinate with Pt^{2+} ion and form tetrakis(amine)platinate precursor and replace the original acac^{−} ligand in Pt(acac)_{2}, and oleic acid can further exchange with acac^{−} and tune the formation kinetics of platinum nanoparticles.

When Pt_{2}(dba)_{3} was decomposed in THF under hydrogen gas in the presence HDA, the reaction took much longer, and formed nanowires with diameters between 1.5 and 2 nm. Decomposition of Pt_{2}(dba)_{3} under hydrogen gas in toluene yielded the formation of nanowires with 2–3 nm diameter independent of HDA concentration. The length of these nanowires was found to be inversely proportional to the concentration of HDA present in solution. When these nanowire syntheses were repeated using reduced concentrations of Pt_{2}(dba)_{3}, there was little effect on the size, length or distribution of the nanowires formed.

Platinum nanoparticles of controlled shape and size have also been accessed through varying the ratio of polymer capping agent concentration to precursor concentration. Reductive colloidal syntheses as such have yielded tetrahedral, cubic, irregular-prismatic, icosahedral, and cubo-octahedral nanoparticles, whose dispersity is also dependent on the concentration ratio of capping agent to precursor, and which may be applicable to catalysis. The precise mechanism of shape-controlled colloidal synthesis is not yet known; however, it is known that the relative growth rate of crystal facets within the growing nanostructure determines its final shape. Polyol syntheses of platinum nanoparticles, in which chloroplatinic acid is reduced to PtCl_{4}^{2−} and Pt^{0} by ethylene glycol, have also been a means to shape-controlled fabrication. Addition of varying amounts of sodium nitrate to these reactions was shown to yield tetrahedra and octahedra at high concentration ratios of sodium nitrate to chloroplatinic acid. Spectroscopic studies suggest that nitrate is reduced to nitrite by PtCl_{4}^{2−} early in this reaction, and that the nitrite may then coordinate both Pt(II) and Pt(IV), greatly slowing the polyol reduction and altering the growth rates of distinct crystal facets within the nanoparticles, ultimately yielding morphological differentiation.

=== Green synthesis ===
An ecologically-friendly synthesis of platinum nanoparticles from chloroplatinic acid was achieved through the use of a leaf extract of Diospyros kaki as a reducing agent. Nanoparticles synthesized as such were spherical with an average diameter ranging from 212 nm depending on reaction temperature and concentration of leaf extract used. Spectroscopic analysis suggests that this reaction is not enzyme-mediated and proceeds instead through plant-derived reductive small molecules. Another eco-friendly synthesis from chloroplatinic acid was reported using leaf extract from Ocimum sanctum and tulsi as reducing agents. Spectroscopic analysis suggested that ascorbic acid, gallic acid, various terpenes, and certain amino acids were active in the reduction. Particles synthesized as such were shown through scanning electron microscopy to consist in aggregates with irregular shape. It has been shown that tea extracts with high polyphenol content may be used both as reducing agents and capping agents for platinum nanoparticle synthesis.

== Properties ==
The chemical and physical properties of platinum nanoparticles (NP) make them applicable for a wide variety of research applications. Extensive experimentation has been done to create new species of platinum NPs, and study their properties. Platinum NP applications include electronics, optics, catalysts, and enzyme immobilization.

=== Catalytic properties ===
Platinum NPs are used as catalysts for proton exchange membrane fuel cell (PEMFC), for industrial synthesis of nitric acid, reduction of exhaust gases from vehicles and as catalytic nucleating agents for synthesis of magnetic NPs. NPs can act as catalysts in homogeneous colloidal solution or as gas-phase catalysts while supported on solid state material. The catalytic reactivity of the NP is dependent on the shape, size and morphology of the particle

One type of platinum NPs that have been researched on are colloidal platinum NPs. Monometallic and bimetallic colloids have been used as catalysts in a wide range of organic chemistry, including, oxidation of carbon monoxide in aqueous solutions, hydrogenation of alkenes in organic or biphasic solutions and hydrosilylation of olefins in organic solutions. Colloidal platinum NPs protected by Poly(N-isopropylacrylamide) were synthesised and their catalytic properties measured. It was determined that they were more active in solution and inactive when phase separated due to its solubility being inversely proportional to temperature.

=== Optical properties ===
Platinum NPs exhibit fascinating optical properties. Being a free electron metal NP like silver and gold, its linear optical response is mainly controlled by the surface plasmon resonance (SPR). Surface plasmon resonance occurs when the electrons in the metal surface are subject to an electromagnetic field that exerts a force on the electrons and cause them to displace from their original positions. The nuclei then exert a restoring force that results in oscillation of the electrons, which increase in strength when frequency of oscillations is in resonance with the incident electromagnetic wave.

The SPR of platinum nanoparticles is found in the ultraviolet range (215 nm), unlike the other noble metal nanoparticles which display SPR in the visible range Experiments were done and the spectra obtained are similar for most platinum particles regardless of size. However, there is an exception. Platinum NPs synthesized via citrate reduction do not have a surface plasmon resonance peak around 215 nm. Through experimentation, the resonance peak only showed slight variations with the change of size and synthetic method (while maintaining the same shape), with the exception of those nanoparticles synthesized by citrate reduction, which did not exhibit and SPR peak in this region..

Through the control of percent composition of 2–5 nm platinum nanoparticles on SiO_{2}, Zhang et al. modeled distinct absorption peaks attributed to platinum in the visible range, distinct from the conventional SPR absorption. This research attributed these absorption features to the generation and transfer of hot electrons from the platinum nanoparticles to the semiconductive material. The addition of small platinum nanoparticles on semiconductors such as TiO_{2} increases the photocatalytic oxidation activity under visible light irradiation. These concepts suggest the possible role of platinum nanoparticles in the development of solar energy conversion using metal nanoparticles. By changing the size, shape and environment of metal nanoparticles, their optical properties can be used for electrontic, catalytic, sensing, and photovoltaic applications.

== Applications ==
=== Fuel cells application ===
==== Hydrogen fuel cells ====
Among the precious metals, platinum is the most active toward the hydrogen oxidation reaction that occurs at the anode in hydrogen fuel cells. In order to meet cost reductions of this magnitude, the Pt catalyst loading must be decreased. Two strategies have been investigated for reducing the Pt loading: the binary and ternary Pt-based alloyed nanomaterials and the dispersion of Pt-based nanomaterials onto high surface area substrates.

==== Methanol fuel cells ====
The methanol oxidation reaction occurs at the anode in direct methanol fuel cells (DMFCs). Platinum is the most promising candidate among pure metals for application in DMFCs. Platinum has the highest activity toward the dissociative adsorption of methanol. However, pure Pt surfaces are poisoned by carbon monoxide, a byproduct of methanol oxidation. Researchers have focused on dispersing nanostructured catalysts on high surface area supporting materials and the development of Pt-based nanomaterials with high electrocatalytic activity toward MOR to overcome the poisoning effect of CO.

==== Electrochemical oxidation of formic acid ====
Formic acid is another attractive fuel for use in PEM-based fuel cells. The dehydration pathway produces adsorbed carbon monoxide. A number of binary Pt-based nanomaterial electrocatalysts have been investigated for enhanced electrocatalytic activity toward formic acid oxidation.

=== Modifying conductivity of zinc oxide materials ===
Platinum NPs can be used to dope zinc oxide (ZnO) materials to improve their conductivity. ZnO has several characteristics that allow it to be used in several novel devices such as development of light-emitting assemblies and solar cells. However, because ZnO is of slightly lower conductivity than metal and indium tin oxide (ITO), it can be doped and hybridized with metal NPs like platinum to improve its conductivity. A method to do so would be to synthesize ZnO NPs using methanol reduction and incorporate at 0.25 at.% platinum NPs. This boosts the electrical properties of ZnO films while preserving its transmittance for application in transparent conducting oxides.

=== Glucose detection applications ===
Enzymatic glucose sensors have drawbacks that originate from the nature of the enzyme. Nonenzymatic glucose sensors with Pt-based electrocatalysts offer several advantages, including high stability and ease of fabrication. Many novel Pt and binary Pt-based nanomaterials have been developed to overcome the challenges of glucose oxidation on Pt surfaces, such as low selectivity, poor sensitivity, and poisoning from interfering species.

=== Other applications ===
Platinum catalysts are alternatives of automotive catalytic converters, carbon monoxide gas sensors, petroleum refining, hydrogen production, and anticancer drugs. These applications utilize platinum nanomaterials due to their catalytic ability to oxidize CO and NOx, dehydrogenate hydrocarbons, and electrolyze water and their ability to inhibit the division of living cells.

== Biological interactions ==
The increased reactivity of nanoparticles is one of their most useful properties and is leveraged in fields such as catalysis, consumer products, and energy storage. However, this high reactivity also means that a nanoparticle in a biological environment may have unintended impacts. For example, many nanoparticles such as silver, copper, and ceria interact with cells to produce reactive oxygen species or ROS which can cause premature cell death through apoptosis. Determining the toxicity of a specific nanoparticle requires knowledge of the particle's chemical composition, shape, size and is a field that is growing alongside advances in nanoparticle research.

Determining the impact of a nanoparticle on a living system is not straightforward. A multitude of in vivo and in vitro studies must be done to fully characterize reactivity. In vivo studies often use whole organisms such as mice or zebrafish to infer the interaction of the nanoparticle on a healthy human body. In vitro studies look at how nanoparticles interact with specific cell colonies, typically of human origin. Both types of experiments are needed for a complete understanding of nanoparticle toxicity, especially human toxicity, since no one model has complete human relevance. Few studies have investigated the ADMET of platinum nanoparticles, and the results demonstrated that they are the ones who persist most in organisms respect to silver and gold nanoparticles.

=== Drug delivery ===
A topic of research within the field of nanoparticles is how to use these small particles for drug delivery. Depending on particle properties, nanoparticle may move throughout the human body are promising as site-specific vehicles for the transport of medicine. Current research using platinum nanoparticles in drug delivery uses platinum-based carries to move antitumor medicine. In one study, platinum nanoparticles of diameter 58.3 nm were used to transport an anticancer drug to human colon carcinoma cells, HT-29. Uptake of the nanoparticles by the cell involves compartmentalization of the nanoparticles within lysosomes. The high acidity environment enables leaching of platinum ions from the nanoparticle, which the researchers identified as causing the increased effectiveness of the drug. In another study, a Pt nanoparticle of diameter 140 nm was encapsulated within a PEG nanoparticle to move an antitumor drug, Cisplatin, within a prostate cancer cell (LNCaP/PC3) population. Use of platinum in drug delivery hinges on its ability to not interact in a harmful manner in healthy portions of the body while also being able to release its contents when in the correct environment.

=== Toxicology ===
Toxicity stemming from platinum nanoparticles can take multiple forms. One possible interaction is cytotoxicity or the ability of the nanoparticle to cause cell death. A nanoparticle can also interact with the cell's DNA or genome to cause genotoxicity. These effects are seen in different levels of gene expression measured through protein levels. Last is the developmental toxicity that can occur as an organism grows. Developmental toxicity looks at the impact the nanoparticle has on the growth of an organism from an embryonic stage to a later set point. Most nanotoxicology research is done on cyto- and genotoxicity as both can easily be done in a cell culture lab.

Platinum nanoparticles have the potential to be toxic to living cells. In one case, 2 nm platinum nanoparticles were exposed to two different types of algae in order to understand how these nanoparticles interact with a living system. In both species of algae tested, the platinum nanoparticles inhibited growth, induced small amounts of membrane damage, and created a large amount of oxidative stress. In another study, researcher tested the effects of differently sized platinum nanoparticles on primary human keratinocytes. The authors tested 5.8 and 57.0 nm Pt nanoparticles. The 57 nm nanoparticles had some hazardous effects including decreased cell metabolism, but the effect of the smaller nanoparticles was much more damaging. The 5.8 nm nanoparticles exhibited a more deleterious effect on the DNA stability of the primary keratincoytes than did the larger nanoparticles. The damage to the DNA was measured for individual cells using single-gel electrophoresis via the comet assay.

Researchers have also compared the toxicity of Pt nanoparticles to other commonly used metallic nanoparticles. In one study, the authors compared the impact of different nanoparticle compositions on the red blood cells found in the human bloodstream. The study showed that 5–10 nm platinum nanoparticles and 20–35 nm gold nanoparticles have very little effect on the red blood cells. In the same study it was found that 5–30 nm silver nanoparticles caused membrane damage, detrimental morphological variation, and haemagglutination to the red blood cells.

In a recent paper published in Nanotoxicology, the authors found that between silver (Ag-NP, d = 5–35 nm), gold (Au-NP, d = 15–35 nm), and Pt (Pt-NP, d = 3–10 nm) nanoparticles, the Pt nanoparticles were the second most toxic in developing zebrafish embryos, behind only the Ag-NPs. However, this work did not examine the size dependence of the nanoparticles on their toxicity or biocompatibility. Size-dependent toxicity was determined by researchers at the National Sun Yat – Sen University in Kaohsiung, Taiwan. This group's work showed that the toxicity of platinum nanoparticles in bacterial cells is strongly dependent on nanoparticle size and shape/morphology. Their conclusions were based on two major observations. First, the authors found that platinum nanoparticles with spherical morphologies and sizes less than 3 nm showed biologically toxic properties; measured in terms of mortality, hatching delay, phenotypic defects and metal accumulation. While those nanoparticles with alternative shapes—such as cuboidal, oval, or floral—and sizes of 5–18 nm showed biocompatibility and no biologically toxic properties. Secondly, out of the three varieties of platinum nanoparticles which exhibited biocompatibility, two showed an increase in bacterial cell growth.

The paper introduces many hypotheses for why these observations were made, but based on other works and basic knowledge of bacterial cell membranes, the reasoning behind the size dependent toxicity observation seems to be twofold. One: The smaller, spherically shaped nanoparticles are able to pass through cell membranes simply due to their reduced size, as well as their shape-compatibility with the typically spherical pores of most cell membranes. Although this hypothesis needs to be further supported by future work, the authors did cite another paper which tracked the respiratory intake of platinum nanoparticles. This group found that 10 μm platinum nanoparticles are absorbed by the mucus of the bronchi and trachea, and can travel no further through the respiratory tract. However, 2.5 μm particles showed an ability to pass through this mucus layer, and reach much deeper into the respiratory tract. Also the larger, uniquely shaped nanoparticles are too large to pass through the pores of the cell membrane, and/or have shapes which are incompatible with the more spherically shaped pores of the cellular membrane. In regards to the observation that the two largest platinum nanoparticles (6–8 nm oval, and 16–18 nm floral) actually increase bacterial cell growth, the explanation could originate in the findings of other works which have shown that platinum nanoparticles have demonstrated significant antioxidative capacity. However, in order for these antioxidative properties to be exploited, the platinum nanoparticles must first enter the cells, so perhaps there is another explanation for this observation of increased bacterial cell growth.

Most studies so far have been size based using an in vivo mouse model. In one study, researchers compared the effects of sun 1 nm and 15 nm platinum nanoparticles on mice. The 15 mg/kg dose of sub 1 nm platinum nanoparticles were found to cause liver damage while the larger particles had no effect. A similar study using a singular injection as an exposure source of platinum nanoparticles into the mouse model found necrosis of tubular epithelial cells for particles under 1 nm, but no effect with those particles of 8 nm. These in vivo studies show a trend that the toxicity of the platinum nanoparticles is size dependent, most likely due to the ability of the nanoparticle to get into a high impactful region within the body. A complete study analyzing the effect of varying sized platinum nanoparticles used both in vivo and in vitro models is used to gain a better understanding what impact these nanoparticles could have. Using mice as a model, they found retention of the platinum nanoparticles by the respiratory tract of the mouse. This was accompanied by a minor to mild inflammation of the surrounding lung tissue. However, their in vitro tests using human and lung epithelial cells found no cytotoxic or oxidative stress effects caused by the platinum nanoparticles despite clear evidence of cellular uptake.

== See also ==
- Colloidal gold
- Decahedral twinned particles
- Nanoparticles
- Nanomaterial based catalyst
- Nanotechnology
- Icosahedral twins
