= (Pentamethylcyclopentadienyl)aluminium(I) =

Names
- Other names AlCp*, Cp*Al

Identifiers
CAS Number	137013-38-8; 132645-87-5 (tetramer)
3D model (JSmol)	Interactive image
- InChI: InChI=1S/4C10H15.4Al/c4*1-6-7(2)9(4)10(5)8(6)3;;;;/h4*1-5H3;;;;/q4*-1;4*+1 Key: XWXYGQVXBXJYTH-UHFFFAOYSA-N
- SMILES: C[C-]12[Al+]34567([Al+]89%10%11%12([Al+]3%13%14%15%16([Al+]48%17%18%19%20[C-]%21(C)C%17(C)=C%18(C)C%19(C)=C%20%21C)[C-]%22(C)C%13(C)=C%14(C)C%15(C)=C%16%22C)[C-]%23(C)C9(C)=C%10(C)C%11(C)=C%12%23C)C1(C)=C5(C)C6(C)=C72C

Properties
Chemical formula	C_{10}H_{15}Al
Molar mass	162.212 g·mol^{−1}
- Except where otherwise noted, data are given for materials in their standard state (at 25 °C [77 °F], 100 kPa). Infobox references

(Pentamethylcyclopentadienyl)aluminium(I) is an organometallic compound with the formula Al(C_{5}Me_{5}) ("Me" is a methyl group; CH_{3}). The compound is often abbreviated to AlCp* or Cp*Al, where Cp* is the pentamethylcyclopentadienide anion (C_{5}Me_{5}^{−}). Discovered in 1991 by Carsten Dohmeier et al., AlCp* serves as the first ever documented example of a room temperature stable monovalent aluminium compound. In its isolated form, Cp*Al exists as the tetramer [Cp*Al]_{4}, and is a yellow crystal that decomposes at temperatures above 100 °C but also sublimes at temperatures above 140 °C.

== Synthesis ==
The earliest documented synthesis and characterization of Cp*Al was by Dohmeier et al. in 1991, where four equivalents of AlCl in toluene/diethyl ether is reacted with two equivalents of 2[Mg(Cp*)_{2}] to give [Cp*Al]_{4} as yellow crystals:

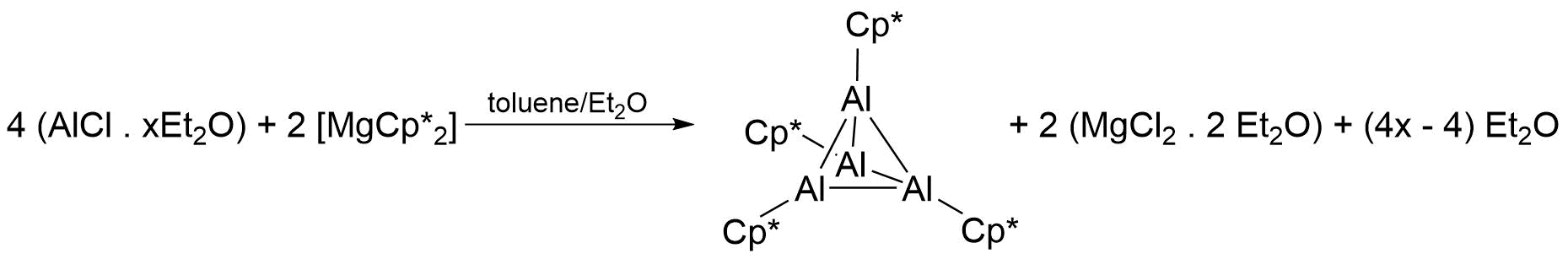
Original synthesis of (Pentamethylcyclopentadienyl)aluminium(I)

Despite the above synthetic scheme successfully producing tetrameters of [Cp*Al]_{4} at reasonable yields (44%), its use of AlCl proved problematic, as AlCl synthesis requires harsh conditions and its reactive nature makes storage a challenge. As such, more facile ways of synthesising the [Cp*Al]_{4} tetramer were discovered, and required the reduction of Cp*AlX_{2} (X = Cl, Br, I) by a metal (K when X = Cl) or a metal alloy (Na/K alloys when X = Br, I):

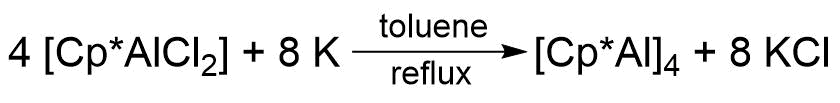
Subsequent more facile method of (Pentamethylcyclopentadienyl)aluminium(I) synthesis

More exotic ways of synthesizing [Cp*Al]_{4} include the controlled disproportionation of an Al(II) dialane into constituent Al(I) and Al(III) products. For example, reacting dialane [Cp*AlBr]_{2} with a Lewis base such as pyridine the Lewis base stabilized [Cp*AlBr_{2}] and [Cp*Al]_{4}.

Monomeric Cp*Al has also been isolated in a solid Ar matrix by heating [Cp*Al]_{4} in toluene to 133 °C and spraying the resultant vapours with Ar onto a copper block kept at 12 K.

== Structure and bonding ==
X-ray crystallographic data determined Cp*Al to exist exclusively as a tetramer in its solid state. This tetramer, [Cp*Al]_{4}, consists of an Al_{4} tetrahedron, and the Cp* rings are η^{5}-coordinated to the aluminium(I) cation such that the planes of the C_{5}Me_{5}^{-} rings are approximately parallel to the opposite base of the Al_{4} tetrahedron. The perpendicular distance between Al and the Cp* ring was determined through crystallography to range from 199.7 to 203.2 pm, with a mean value of 201.5 pm. The Al-Al bond in [Cp*Al]_{4} is 276.9 pm, which is slightly shorter than that of metallic aluminium, which has an Al-Al bond length of 286 pm. Additionally, the Al-Al bond in [Cp*Al]_{4} is significantly shorter than other oligomeric and polymeric Group III M(I)-η^{5}-Cp* compounds such as octahedral [InCp*]_{6} (394, 336 pm), dimeric [InCp*]_{2} (363.1 pm), and polymeric [TlCp*] (641 pm), indicating a significantly larger interaction between aluminium atoms in [Cp*Al]_{4} than monovalent Cp* compounds of In(I) and Tl(I). Additional characterization that has been performed include Raman spectroscopy, which detected a Raman active breathing vibration (A_{1}, 377 cm-1) of the Al_{4} tetrahedron in [Cp*Al]_{4}.

Natural bond orbital (NBO) analysis of [Cp*Al] and [Cp*Al]_{4} using B3LYP/6-31G(d,p) calculated the average charge transfer per Cp* fragment to an Al atom to be 0.657 and 0.641 respectively. This is slightly higher than the charge transfers calculated on [CpAl] and [Cp*Al]_{4} (0.630 and 0.591 respectively). NBO calculation of the HOMO–LUMO gap in [Cp*Al] also revealed a significant decreasing in the tetrameric [Cp*Al]_{4} complex compared to the monomeric [Cp*Al] (4.36 compared to 5.49), which is consistent with density functional theory calculations of analogous systems including superatom complexes of gold, aluminium and gallium. Atoms in molecules (AIM) calculations calculate the Al-Al bonding to be metallic. Stabilization of [Cp*Al]_{4} relative to [CpAl]_{4} is thought to arise from addition of H-H interactions on the methyl groups attached to the Cp* ligand as opposed to the increased Al-Al bonding interactions.

Despite its typically tetrameric form, the monomer Cp*Al has been isolated and studied in the gas-phase using gas-phase electron diffraction. In its gaseous monomeric form, the perpendicular distance between the Al to the Cp* ring was calculated to be 206.3(8) pm, which is slightly longer than tetrameric [Cp*Al]_{4}.

== Reactivity ==
When isolated in a solid H_{2} doped Ar matrix, monomeric Cp*Al has shown to form the hydride species H_{2}Cp*Al upon exposure to H_{2} and photolysis with a Hg lamp:

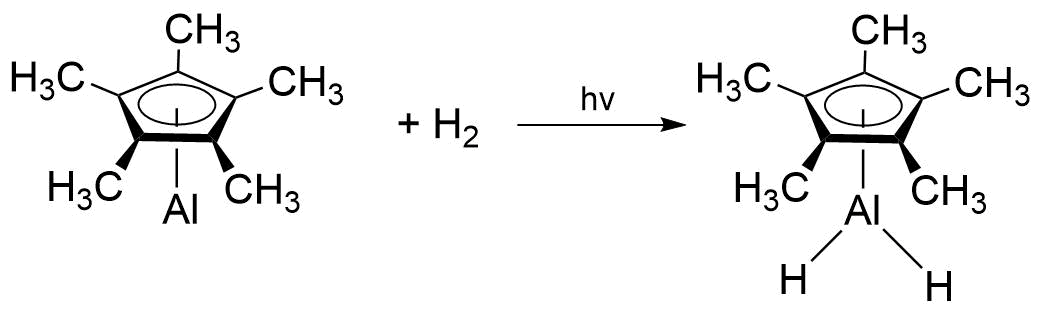
Cp*AlH_{2} formation from hydrogenation of monomeric Cp*Al isolated in a H_{2} doped Ar matrix

At temperatures above 100 °C, [Cp*Al]_{4} decomposes to form pentamethylcyclopentandiene (Cp*H), metallic aluminium (Al(0)) and other non-volatile Al(III) compounds. The overall stability of [Cp*Al]_{4} is unique as there is a thermodynamic affinity for tetrameric aluminium(I) compounds ([RAl]_{4}) to disproportionate into elemental aluminium and R_{3}Al. As such, a number of different novel oligomeric structures can be synthesised when using tetrameric [Cp*Al]_{4} as a precursor. For example, treatment of [Cp*Al]_{4} with excess selenium and tellurium in mild conditions gives the unique heterocubane structures [Cp*AlSe]_{4} and [Cp*AlTe]_{4} respectively. These heterocubane structures are extremely air and moisture sensitive, leading to its decomposition and evolution of H_{2}Se and H_{2}Te respectively. Analogously, reaction of [Cp*Al]_{4} with lighter chalcogens such as O_{2}, N_{2}O and sulfur yield [Cp*AlX]_{4} (X = O, S).

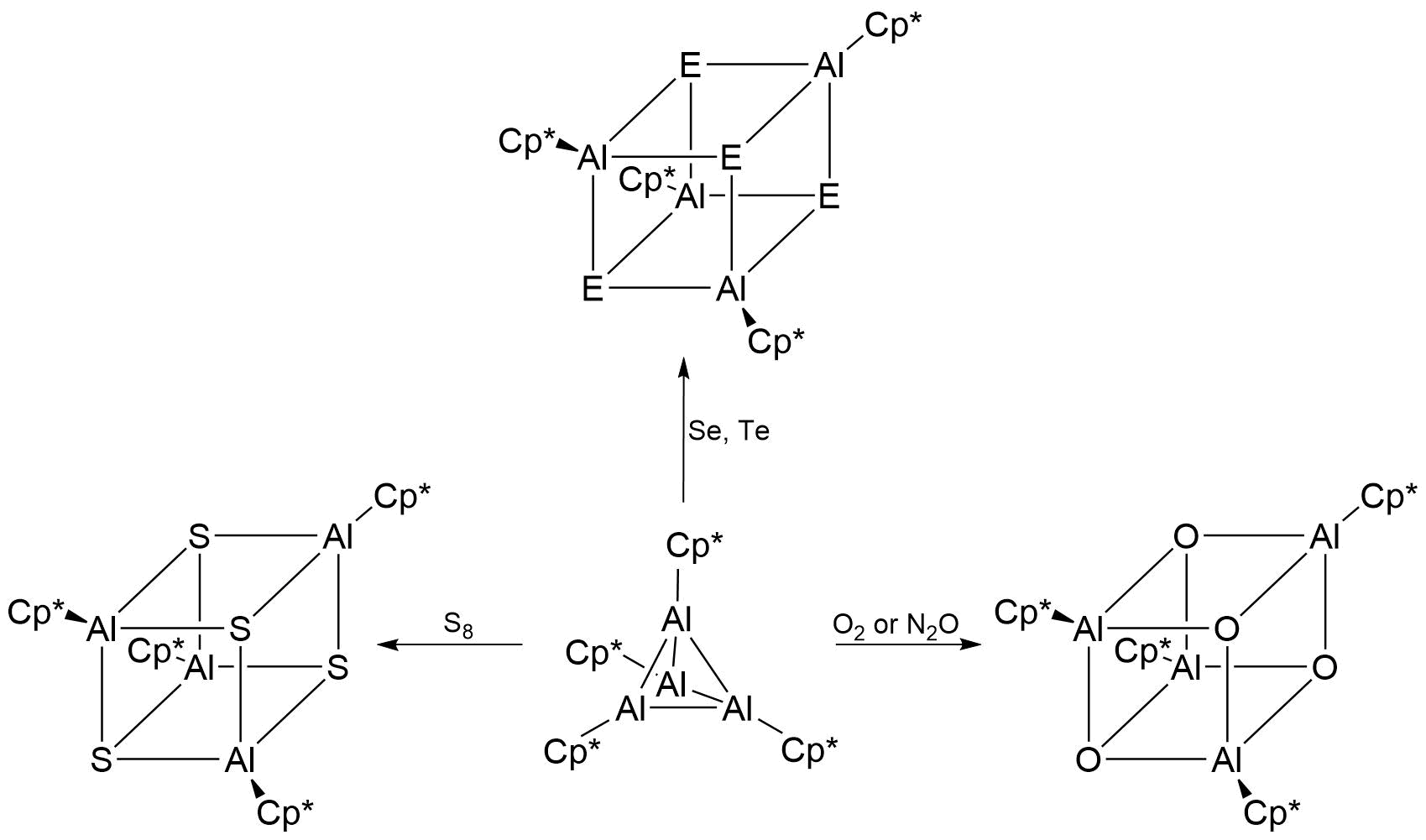
Formation of heterocubane structures using tetrameric [Cp*Al]_{4} as a precursor

[Cp*Al]_{4} was also the used as a precursor to synthesize the first ever stable dimeric iminoalane containing an Al_{2}N_{2} heterocycle through the treatment of [Cp*Al]_{4} with Me_{3}SiN_{3} in a 1:4 molar ratio. The resultant iminoalanes was characterized to contain an ideally planar Al_{2}N_{2} core ring with three coordinate aluminium and nitrogen atoms. Other dimeric iminoalanes including [Cp*AlNSi(i-Pr)_{3}]_{2}, [Cp*AlNSiPh_{3}]_{2} and [Cp*AlNSi(t-Bu)_{3}]_{2} have since been synthesized using [Cp*Al]_{4} as a precursor through oxidative addition of an organic azide.

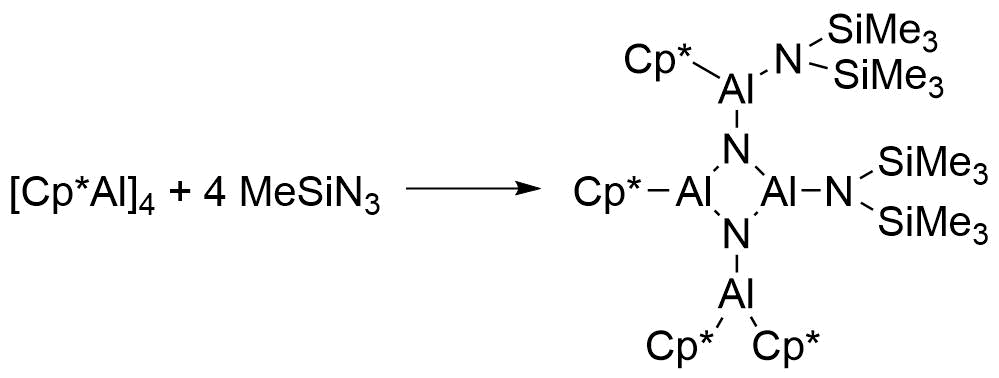
Reaction of [Cp*Al]_{4} with MeSiN_{3}

=== Function as a ligand ===
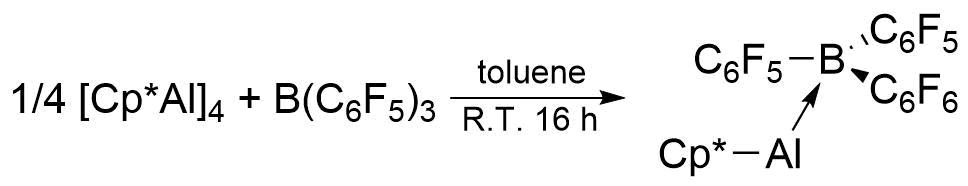
[Cp*Al]_{4} forming a Lewis Acid-Base adduct with B(C_{6}F_{5})_{3}

[Cp*Al] is able to act as an atypical exotic ligand in donor-acceptor type bonds. For example, mixing [Cp*Al]_{4} with the Lewis acidic B(C_{6}F_{6})_{3} forms the Al-B donor-acceptor type bond, and results in the synthesis of the adduct [Cp*Al-B(C_{6}F_{6})_{3}]. Analogous main-group complexes that have been synthesised and characterised include dialane complexes [Cp*Al-Al(C_{6}F_{5})_{3}] and [Cp*Al-Al(t-Bu)_{3}], and group 13-group 13 complexes [Cp*Al-Ga(t-Bu)_{3}].

[Cp*Al] is also able to act as a potent ligand to transition metals. For example, treatment of [Cp*Al] with [(dcpe)Pt(H)(CH_{2}t-Bu)] (dcpe = bis(dicyclohexylphosphino)ethane) yields [(dcpe)Pt(Cp*Al)_{2}]. Other transition metals which use [Cp*Al] as a ligand include, but are not limited to d^{10} metal centre complexes such as [Pd(Cp*Al)_{4}] and [Ni(Cp*Al)_{4}], and lanthanide/actinide metal centre complexes such as (CpSiMe_{3})_{3}U-AlCp*, (CpSiMe_{3})3Nd-AlCp* and (CpSiMe_{3})_{3}Ce-AlCp*.

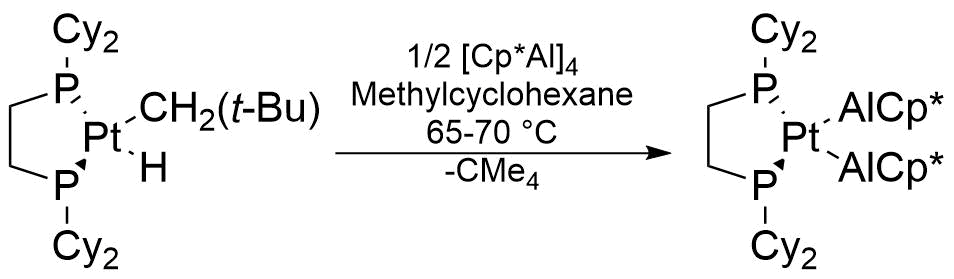
[Cp*Al]_{4} acting as a ligand
