= Magic number (chemistry) =

Number of atoms present in the clusters of critical sizes with higher stability

The concept of magic numbers in the field of chemistry refers to a specific property (such as stability) for only certain representatives among a distribution of structures. It was first recognized by inspecting the intensity of mass-spectrometric signals of rare gas cluster ions. Then, the same effect was observed with sodium clusters.

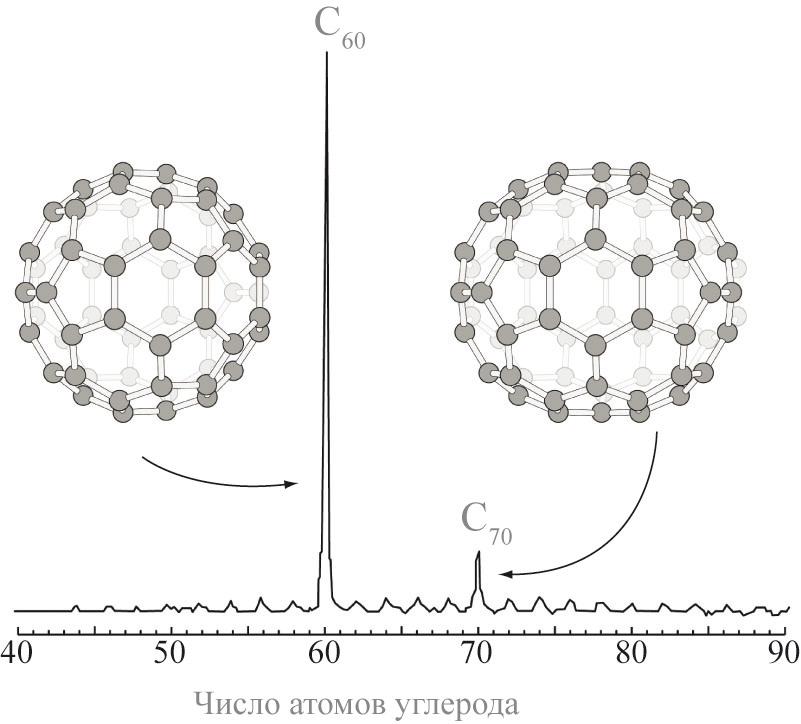
A mass-spectrum of fullerene clusters produced by laser evaporation of graphite. The larger peak corresponds to C_{60}+, the smaller peak- C_{70}+.

In case a gas condenses into clusters of atoms, the number of atoms in these clusters that are most likely to form varies between a few and hundreds. However, there are peaks at specific cluster sizes, deviating from a pure statistical distribution. Therefore, it was concluded that clusters of these specific numbers of atoms dominate due to their exceptional stability.

One well-known example of such atomic condensation is the set of C_{60} , C_{70} and C_{84} fullerenes, shown in the figure on the right.

The concept was also successfully applied to explain the mono-dispersed occurrence of thiolate-protected gold clusters; here the outstanding stability of specific cluster sizes is connected with their respective electronic configuration.

The term magic numbers is also used in the field of nuclear physics. In this context, magic numbers refer to a specific number of protons or neutrons that forms complete nucleon shells.

== See also ==
- Magic number (physics)
