= Cluster (physics) =

Small collection of atoms or molecules

Clusters in physics refers to small, polyatomic particles. Any particle made of between 3 × 10^{0} and 3 × 10^{7} atoms is considered a cluster.

The term can also refer to the organization of protons and neutrons within an atomic nucleus, e.g. the alpha particle (also known as "α-cluster"), consisting of two protons and two neutrons (as in a helium nucleus).

== Overview ==
Although first reports of cluster species date back to the 1940s, cluster science emerged as a separate direction of research in the 1980s, One purpose of the research was to study the gradual development of collective phenomena which characterize a bulk solid. For example, these are the color of a body, its electrical conductivity, its ability to absorb or reflect light, and magnetic phenomena such as ferromagnetism, ferrimagnetism, or antiferromagnetism. These are typical collective phenomena which only develop in an aggregate of a large number of atoms.

It was found that collective phenomena break down for very small cluster sizes. It turned out, for example, that small clusters of a ferromagnetic material are super-paramagnetic rather than ferromagnetic. Paramagnetism is not a collective phenomenon, which means that the ferromagnetism of the macrostate was not conserved by going into the nanostate. The question then was asked for example, "How many atoms do we need in order to obtain the collective metallic or magnetic properties of a solid?" Soon after the first cluster sources had been developed in 1980, an ever larger community of cluster scientists was involved in such studies.

This development led to the discovery of fullerenes in 1986 and carbon nanotubes a few years later.

In science, a lot is known about properties of the gas phase; however, comparatively little is known about the condensed phases (the liquid phase and solid phase). The study of clusters attempts to bridge this gap of knowledge by clustering atoms together and studying their characteristics. If enough atoms were clustered together, eventually one would obtain a liquid or solid.

The study of atomic and molecular clusters also benefits the developing field of nanotechnology. If new materials are to be made out of nanoscale particles, such as nanocatalysts and quantum computers, the properties of the nanoscale particles (the clusters) would first need to be understood.

== See also ==
- Cluster chemistry
- Nanoparticle
- Nanocluster
