= Carbon nanotube supported catalyst =

Novel catalyst using carbon nanotubes as the support instead of the conventional alumina

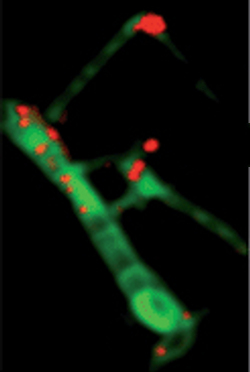
Scanning transmission X-ray microscopy image of pod-like carbon nanotube decorated with Fe nanoparticles (red).

Carbon nanotube supported catalyst is a novel supported catalyst, using carbon nanotubes as the support instead of the conventional alumina or silicon support. The exceptional physical properties of carbon nanotubes (CNTs) such as large specific surface areas, excellent electron conductivity incorporated with the good chemical inertness, and relatively high oxidation stability makes it a promising support material for heterogeneous catalysis.

The catalyst is a substance, usually used in small amounts relative to the reactants, that increases the rate of a chemical reaction without itself undergoing any permanent chemical change. One or more kinds of catalysts can be loaded on another material with a high surface area, which serves as the support, to form a supported catalyst as a whole system. In a supported catalyst system, the significance of using the support are to increase the dispersion of the active phases, to have a better control of the porous structure, to improve mechanical strength, to prevent sintering and to assist catalysis. There is a wide spectrum of supports ranging from conventional and most commonly alumina to novel various kinds of activated carbon. Synthesis methods and functions vary greatly due to different kinds of support and catalytic materials.

The challenge in making a supported nanoparticulate catalyst is to avoid agglomeration. This can be achieved by using a poly-functional anchoring agent, and drying under a relatively low temperature. Relative research are deposition of palladium and platinum particles on activated carbon, using a poly-acrylate anchor. To unveil more molecular details of the extensive interactions between precursors and supports in an aqueous environment, studies of adsorption and precipitation chemistry must be taken into account. Progress is being made in the use of chemical vapor deposition for the synthesis of supported catalysts. Combinatorial techniques have seen their contributions to solid catalyst synthesis.

== Background ==
=== Catalyst supports and supported catalysts ===
Catalysts are widely used in various chemical reactions. The activity, stability, selectivity, and regeneration ability are the most important properties to be considered in catalyst design.

The catalyst supports can improve specific properties such as mechanical strength, distribution, stability, catalytical reactivity and selectivity of catalysts. The definition of the support is broad: the shape of support varies, including granular, powdered, colloidal, coprecipitated, extruded, pelleted, spherical, wires, honeycombs, and skeletal supports. Catalyst supports can be either inert or active in reactions. The ensemble of the catalyst and its support can be regarded as an entirety: supported catalyst.

In pre-1940 publications, the supports were only considered as physical carriers on which the catalytic metal or oxide was disposed as broadly and uniformly as possible. But over the years, a better understanding of the cofunctioning of catalysts and their supports has been achieved. It was recognized that the support was actually a promoter in many cases. In Catalysis (Berkman et al. 1940), the difference between a promoter and a support is described as the difference in quantity: when the support exceeds the quantity of the catalyst, it is a support; otherwise it is a promoter. This view was more or less simplistic, but implied the recognition that even at this early year the support was a catalytic component in the broadly construed catalytic composition.

An early purpose of the support was to obtain a solid granular material coated with catalytic component, providing a hard and stable structure to withstand disintegration under gas or liquid flows. Another purpose to load catalytical noble metal on supports is to dilute noble metals in a larger volume. Some supports act as a stabilizer to prevent lower-melting-point materials from agglomeration. Another use of the support was to serve as a reservoir for semi-molten salts.

Many experiments about alumina were conducted at the early period, which helped people to realize that catalysts supported on different species of alumina have different catalytic properties. During the same time frame, it was noticed that the catalyst and the support were cooperating in some cases to produce two simultaneous and mutually beneficial reactions. This was called the dual-functioning catalyst and was observed in those hydrodenitrogenation, hydrodesulfurization, and reforming catalysts reactions.

=== Traditional carbon materials as supports ===
Carbon is a ubiquitous element that forms millions of compounds, ranging from simple carbon monoxide to highly complex enzymes. Regarding to its elemental form, although there is no catalytic properties ascribed to diamond, graphite is known to be an active catalyst in some oxidation reactions. Graphitic carbon is also used as a support material where other catalytic components may be dispersed, resulting in an increase of the surface area they expose to the chemical reactants.

The applications of graphite, carbon black and activated charcoal manufactured annually as catalyst support are relatively few. The major catalytical use of charcoals and carbon blacks is to support metals. In addition, charcoals are sometimes used to support compounds such as sulfides and halides. Some graphite is used to support metals, but the most important feature of graphite is its ability to form intercalates, which are the catalysts for some hydrogenation, dehydrogenation, isomerization, alkylation, hydrodealkylation, polymerization and ammonia formation reactions. For charcoal and carbon black-supported metals with various industrial uses, the methods of manufacture can be divided into three broad groups based on the catalytic metal loaded: wet impregnation, hydrolysis impregnation and chemical vapor deposition (CVD).

== Carbon nanotubes as supports ==
=== Properties ===
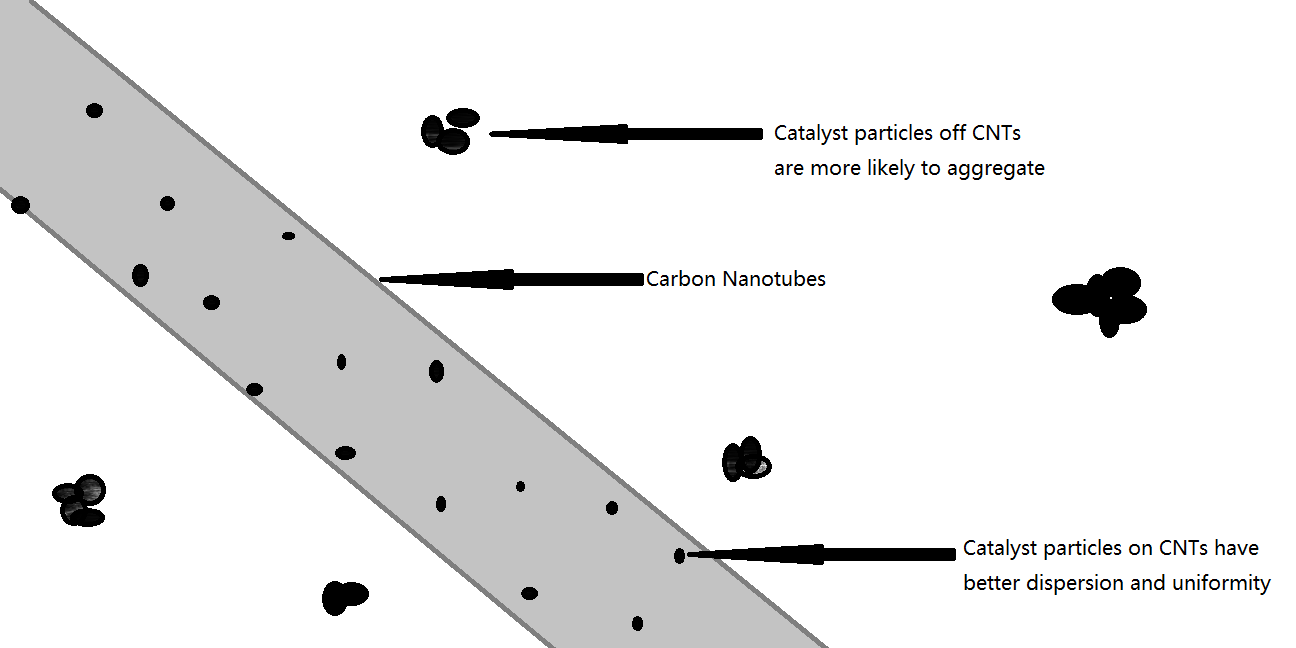
Schematic of CNT-supported catalyst

Many textbooks describe carbon nanotubes (CNTs) in easily understood terms: carbon nanotubes are tubular structures made entirely of rolled-up layers of graphene. The diameters of CNTs ranges from about one nanometer to tens of nanometers, while their lengths can be up to centimeters, much greater than the diameters. In general, the hollow geometry of CNTs leads to large specific surface areas, which makes CNTs extremely attractive supports for heterogeneous catalysts. Another advantage of CNTs is their relatively high oxidation stability which is induced by their structural integrity and chemical inertness. Additionally, CNTs have exceptional physical properties including electrical conductivity, mechanical strength and thermal conductivity, which are important factors for catalyst supports. CNTs can be either metallic or semiconductive, depending on their helicity and diameter, and this property can greatly affect charge transfer processes. CNTs possess a very large Young's modulus, as well as a great tensile strength, and their flexibility property makes them an ideal component for applications in composite materials. CNTs also have good thermal conductivity, which helps to prevent the agglomeration and growth of small nanoparticles during post-annealing treatments, and stabilize newly formed phases.

In summary, CNTs are tough and tensile, owning good electron conductivity and chemical inertness, as well as thermal conductivity. Therefore, they become ideal and unique templates for nanoparticle immobilization, which allows the construction of designed nanoarchitectures. This makes CNTs extremely attractive supports for heterogeneous catalysts and related technologies.

=== Preparation of carbon nanotubes ===
CNTs are generally produced by four main techniques: arc discharge, laser ablation, molten salt intercalation, and chemical vapor deposition. Since as-produced CNTs usually contain a variety of impurities such as graphene fragments, amorphous carbon, fullerenes and metal catalyst particles. Since the impurities interfere with most of our desired properties and influence biocompatibility of CNTs, impairing the catalytical performance and limiting the application, they need to be purified and separated. CNTs need to be functionalized with different groups before being used in hybrid materials based on their purpose as well. Furthermore, in many applications we require uniform and stable dispersions of CNTs, but pristine single-walled CNTs (SWCNTs) are insoluble in most solvents, leading to aggregation between individual tubes. We also want to separate CNTs based on whether they are semiconducting or metallic.

The production of CNTs has become easier and cheaper by the years, and the quality of as-prepared CNTs has improved since the contaminated impurities are considered. As a result, the major challenge is to develop cheap and facile methods to improve the uniformity in lengths, diameters and chirality of CNTs. CNTs has great potential as an important bridge connecting the molecular realm and the macroscopic world.

=== Characterization ===
The characterization techniques of CNTs supported catalysts are varied. The most common methods include X-ray diffraction (XRD), energy dispersive X-ray spectroscopy (EDS), X-Ray photoelectron spectroscopy (XPS), transmission electron microscopy (TEM), scanning electron microscopy (SEM), high-resolution TEM (HRTEM), near-infrared spectroscopy, UV absorption spectroscopy, photoluminescence spectroscopy and fluorescence microscopy. These techniques and methodologies have been employed to not only comprehensively characterize CNT–nanocrystal heterostructures, but also thoroughly investigate the properties of these hybrid materials.

== Preparation ==
To obtain a CNTs supported catalyst, the first step is to load the catalytic materials onto CNTs. A variety of synthesis strategies for the CNT/metal nanoparticle hybrids can be classified as ex situ and in situ techniques.

=== Ex situ approaches ===
Ex situ approaches utilize different interactions including covalent interactions, noncovalent interactions, π-π stacking and electrostatic interactions.

Covalent interactions are used to attach inorganic nanoparticles with various function group terminals to CNTs treated by acids. One typical example is amide bond. Because of the excellent biological compatibility of Au, they are so frequently used in biosensing, medical and other related fields. Au nanoparticles have been linked to acid treated CNTs by aminothiols, bifunctional thiols or thioether bonds. Hydrophilic metal oxides such as MnO_{2}, MgO, TiO_{2} and Zr(SO_{4})_{2} can be directly attached to the carboxyl groups, averting the use and separation of linking agent. On the other hand, however, the interactions are relatively weak, and the distribution of the nanoparticles are not as uniform.

Besides covalent bonds, the linkage between catalytic particles and pure CNTs can also be achieved by noncovalent interactions such as van der Waals interactions, hydrogen bonding, π-π stacking, and electrostatic interactions. The surfactant sodium dodecylsulfate (SDS) is widely used to attach diverse nanoparticles including Pt, EuF_{3}, TbF_{3} and SiO_{2} to multi-walled carbon nanotubes (MWCNTs). In another approach which utilizes hydrophobic capping agents, for instance, octanethiols and dodecanethiols, both coverage and morphology of the hybrid materials can be well controlled by modifying the length and functional groups of the chains. A similar route is to make use of the delocalized π electrons of CNTs as well as those in aromatic organic compounds containing polar group terminated alkyl chains. The most distinguished advantage of this method is that pyrene compounds are absorbed on CNTs, which improves the solubility of CNTs, together with dispersibility and charge transfer ability of loaded nanoparticles. In another simple and facile approach where electrostatic interactions are utilized, ionic polyelectrolytes are deposited on CNTs so as to attract charged nanoparticles.

=== In situ approaches ===
In situ approaches are alternatives for ex situ approaches with a better control of particle dispersion. Inorganic compounds are directly formed on the surface of CNTs via a variety of techniques including electrochemical techniques, sol-gel process, hydrothermal and aerosol techniques and gas-phase deposition.

Electrochemistry is a method that controls the nucleation and growth process of noble metals and alloys efficaciously. Metal complexes in solutions can be reduced by electrons provided on electrodes to form metal nanoparticles, and the size of the metal nanoparticles and their coverage on the sidewalls of CNTs can be controlled by changing electrochemical deposition parameters such as deposition time and nucleation potential.

Sol-gel process is a commonly used solution-based process which can produce glass and ceramic materials of different shapes. In this process, the reactants (usually metal salts or metal organic compounds) go through a series of hydrolysis and condensation reactions and form colloidal or polymeric sols, followed by an aging process to convert the sols into gels. Then gels are then desiccated drying under supercritical conditions and converted into aerogel. This is a cheap technique avoiding the requirement of high temperature, enabling fine controls in chemical composition as well as lowest concentration of dopants. But it also shows the weakness that the product will typically contain an amorphous phase, thus crystallization and post-annealing steps are required and increase the complexity of preparation.

Hydrothermal techniques are developed in recent years. The advantage of this method is to get crystalline particles or films without post-annealing and calcinations. Formation of inorganic nanowires and nanorods can also be achieved by the forced crystallization in hydrothermal process.

In addition, various gas-phase deposition methods are used to load inorganic catalytical particles onto CNTs surface. Among the most commonly used gas-phase deposition methods, chemical and physical vapor depositions enjoy an advantage in excellent control over the size, shape and uniformity. Thin and continuous films can be deposited on carbon substrates, retaining the 3D integrity. Other physical techniques such as sputtering and pulsed laser deposition (PLD), together with chemical methods (for instance, atomic layer deposition (ALD)), are good alternatives to deposit desired particles on CNTs.

=== Limitations ===
One general difficulty to deposit catalytic metal or metal oxides on CNTs is to control the size and distribution of the particles. Many of these preparations suffer from deposition scarcity, unwanted large size or aggregates of catalyst particles even at a relatively low loading content. On the other hand, in order to decorate CNTs with catalytic particles, a functionalization process is generally required beforehand: this makes the preparation more complex and increases the cost. In addition, after attaching functional groups on CNTs, the properties of CNTs are usually affected, and the performance of as-prepared hybrid material will be impaired as a result. For these reasons, more facile preparation methods with less impact on the properties of CNTs need to be developed.

== Applications ==
Although at an early stage of research, CNTs supported metal-nanoparticle catalysts as transition metals Ru, Co, Ag, Pt, Pd, and Au shed new light to catalysis reactions in many fields such as batteries, flat panel displays, and chemical sensors. In organic synthesis like Heck reaction or Fischer–Tropsch synthesis, CNTs supported Pd or Co catalysts are applied to improve catalytic activity or to optimize experimental conditions. For the selective catalytic reduction of NO_{x} with hydrocarbons, CNTs supported Pt–Rh catalyst displays higher NO_{x} reduction activity.

Particularly, with hydrogen carbon-based fuel reserves rapidly running out, fuel cell and battery with application of CNTs-supported metal nanoparticles catalysts have been an active area of research. For example, catalytic hydrogenation of CO_{2} to produce methanol has been considered as one of the most economical and effective ways to chemically fix huge amount of emitted CO_{2} and also to improve climate conditions. CNTs supported Pd catalyst has considerable activity and selectivity, which is favored in hydrogenation of CO_{2}.

However, to realize these applications from laboratory devices to industrial prototypes, further optimization is needed. Many challenges remain such as the control of the interface and the morphology, phase composition of the catalysts, and the type and quality of CNTs. Reproducibility problem can not be ignored, and a better understanding of the relationship between structures and properties is also in need.

=== Carbon nanotube-supported Pd catalyst ===
In the catalysts of Heck reaction, precious metal Pd was the most used active component. Supported Pd catalysts displayed many advantages. Compared with the traditional homogeneous Pd(OAc)_{2}, PdCl_{2} catalysts in Heck reaction, CNTs-supported Pd catalyst has higher catalytic activity, better stability, easier separation and more satisfactory reusability.

In experimental process, carbon nanotube supported Pd catalysts were prepared using chemical reduction. Additional chemical reductant is used to solve the agglomeration of Pd nanoparticles.

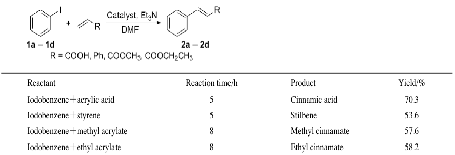
Figure 2. Heck arylation catalyzed by the CNT supported palladium catalyst

=== Carbon nanotube-supported Pd-metal catalyst ===
Formic acid is a non-toxic and non-explosive liquid at room temperature. It has low toxicity, facility of storage, handling and primarily high energy density. such advantages are favored for potential applications in small portable fuel cell. Carbon supported Pd catalysts have played a very important role in DFAFC (direct formic acid fuel cell) catalyst research in recent years due to their good activity as well as more efficient Pd metal utilization and lower metal loadings.

The mechanism of formic acid electrooxidation on Pt and Pt-group metal surfaces selection in acid solution follows the dual pathways: dehydrogenation and dehydration. Multi-walled carbon nanotubes (MWCNTs) have higher nanoparticle dispersion as the support of the cathode electrocatalyst. Therefore, it showed a better performance than that electrocatalysts supported on carbon black in DEFCs (direct ethanol fuel cells).

=== Carbon nanotube-supported Pd-metal-oxide catalyst ===
Hydrogenation of CO_{2} has been considered as one of the most economical and effective ways in fixing huge amount of emitted CO_{2}. Supported Pd-metal-oxide catalysts have been found to show considerable activity and selectivity for hydrogenation of CO_{2} to methanol, and the supporter has significant effect on the performance of the catalyst.

MWCNT-supported Pd–ZnO catalysts for hydrogenation of carbon dioxide to methanol played dual roles as a catalyst supporter and a promoter. Greater amount of hydrogen can be absorbed to generate a micro-environment with higher the concentration of active H-adspecies at the surface of the functioning catalyst, thus increasing the rate of surface hydrogenation reactions.

=== Carbon nanotubes supported Pt catalyst ===
Direct ethanol fuel cells (DEFC) and direct methanol fuel cells (DMFC) are highly efficient, pollution-free and noiseless energy conversion systems that can produce electricity through electrochemical reactions. They are expected to be useful as a power source for portable electronic devices including laptop computers, cell-phones, and so on. The activity of electrocatalysts play a key role in the commercialization of DMFC or DEFC. Among the many electrocatalysts, Pt enjoys high electrocatalytic efficiency and has been proved to be the most effective catalysts for alcohol oxidation reactions. Bimetallic catalysts including Pt and a second precious or non-precious metal (like Ru, Rh, Sn, Pb, Sb, Ni, etc.) are often applied to enhance the electrochemical activity of Pr and at the same time avoiding its deactivation when exposed to poisoning intermediates by the bifunctional or ligand mechanisms.

As a kind of electrocatalyst support, CNTs have shown better corrosion-resistance than other catalyst supports such as carbon black under operational conditions. Besides, CNTs not only enjoy a highly electrochemically accessible surface area but can also offer a remarkable electronic conductivity due to its multi-wall structure, which properties render it a competitive electrocatalyst support for Pt-catalyst.

It has been found that the electrochemical activity of different Pt-catalysts follows the order of Pt-WO_{3}/CNT > Pt-Ru/E-TEK-Vulcan > Pt/CNT > Pt/E-TEK-Vulcan > bulk platinum. The reason why CNT based materials have higher electrochemical response is most probably due to its higher surface area that are electroactive.

=== Carbon nanotubes supported Co nanoparticles catalyst ===
The Fischer–Tropsch synthesis (FTS) process needs to be catalyzed by certain transition metals as Co, Fe, and Ru which present the highest activity. Among them, Co catalysts are preferred because of their high activity and selectivity to linear hydrocarbons for FTS, more stable, and low cost compared to Ru. Activated carbon has many advantages, such as resistance to acidic or basic media, stable at high temperatures, etc., serving as FTS catalyst support.

Using carbon nanotubes as Co catalyst support was found to decrease the temperature of cobalt oxide species. The strong metal-support interactions are reduced greatly and the reducibility of the catalysts improved significantly. CNTs help to increase the dispersion of metal clusters and thus decreasing the average cobalt clusters size. Research showed that the hydrocarbon yield obtained by inventive CNTs supported Co catalyst is considerably larger than that obtained from Co on alumina supports.
