= Metrohm =

Swiss scientific instruments company

Metrohm AG
- Company type: Stock corporation
- Industry: Scientific instruments, Analytical chemistry
- Founded: 1943, Herisau, Switzerland
- Founders: Berthold Suhner, Willy Studer
- Headquarters: Herisau, Switzerland
- Key people: Patrick Grüninger (Chairman of the board of directors); Christoph Fässler (Chairman of the board of administrators)
- Products: Titration, Ion chromatography, Spectroscopy, Electrochemistry, Laboratory automation
- Revenue: > CHF 400 million (2021)
- Owner: Metrohm Foundation
- Number of employees: 3,200 (2024)
- Website: metrohm.com

Metrohm AG is an internationally active producer of precision instruments for chemical analysis, in particular ion analysis, based in Herisau, Switzerland. Metrohm is the leading manufacturer of titration devices and one of the two biggest manufacturers of ion chromatography systems. Besides, the product range includes systems for near-infrared and Raman spectroscopy, electrochemical measurements, and process analytics. These products are used in industries such as pharmaceuticals, food, chemicals, energy, and environmental analysis.

== History ==
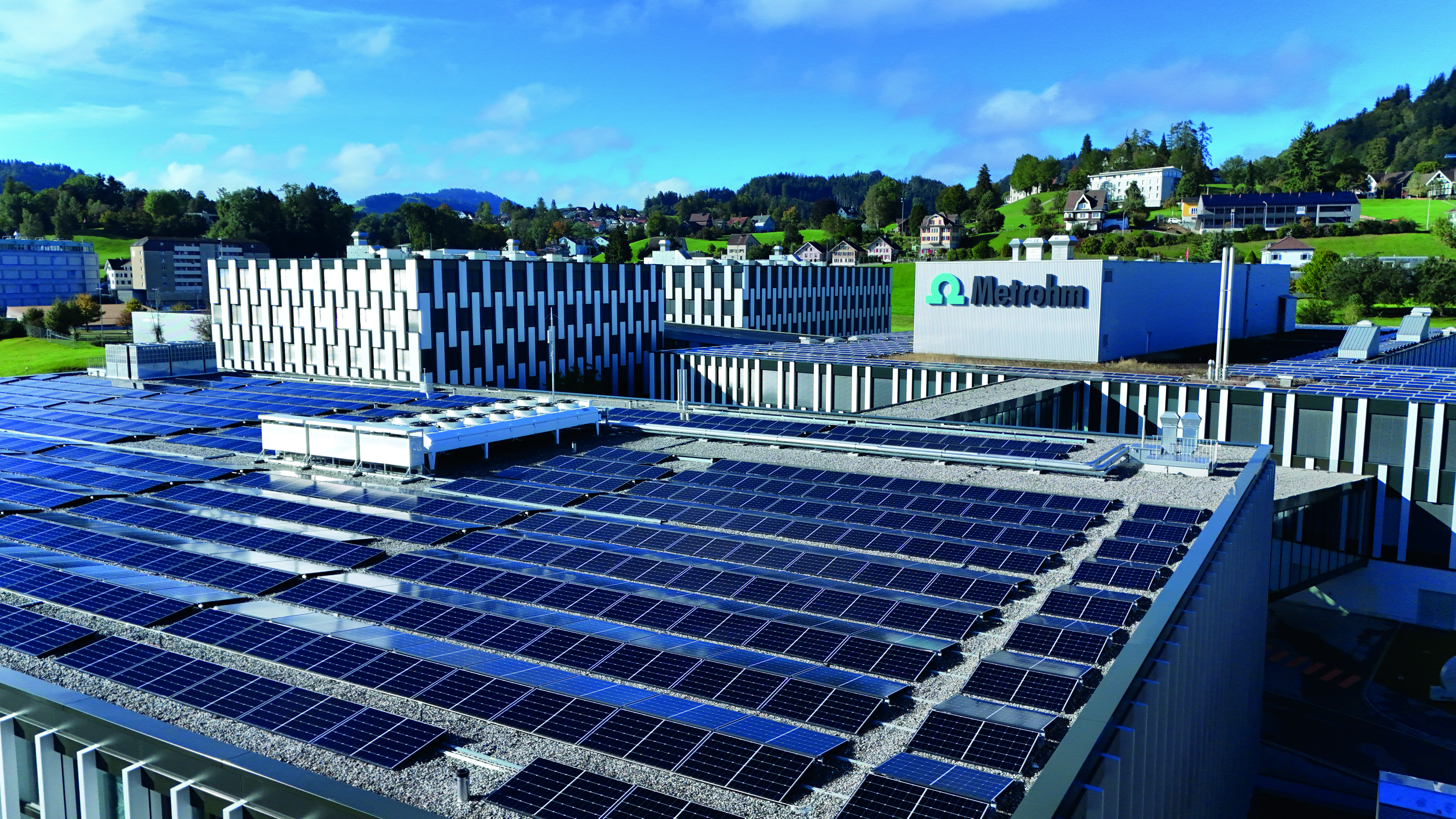
Metrohm building in Herisau, Switzerland

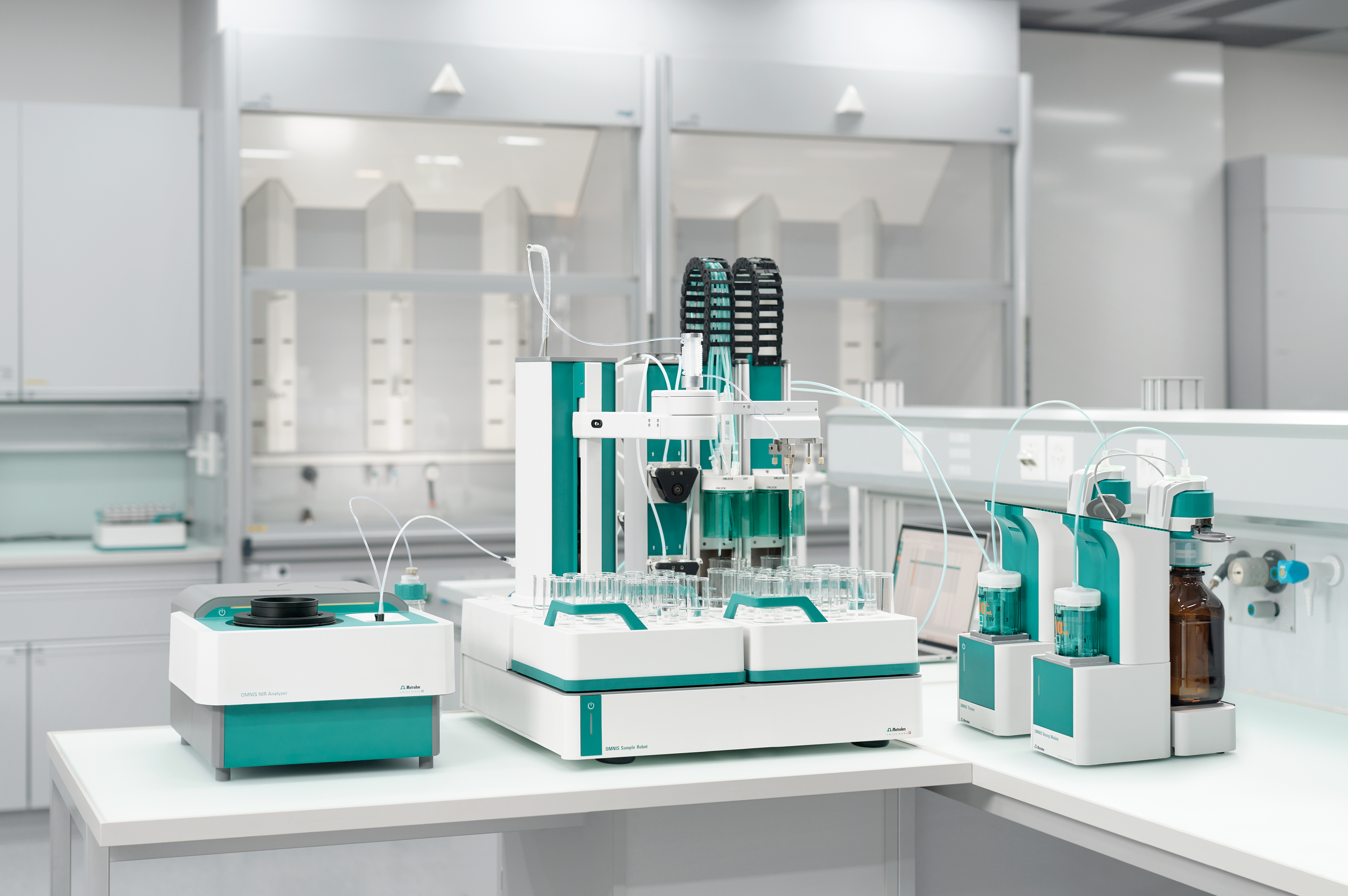
OMNIS platform with titration, NIR spectroscopy, and automation

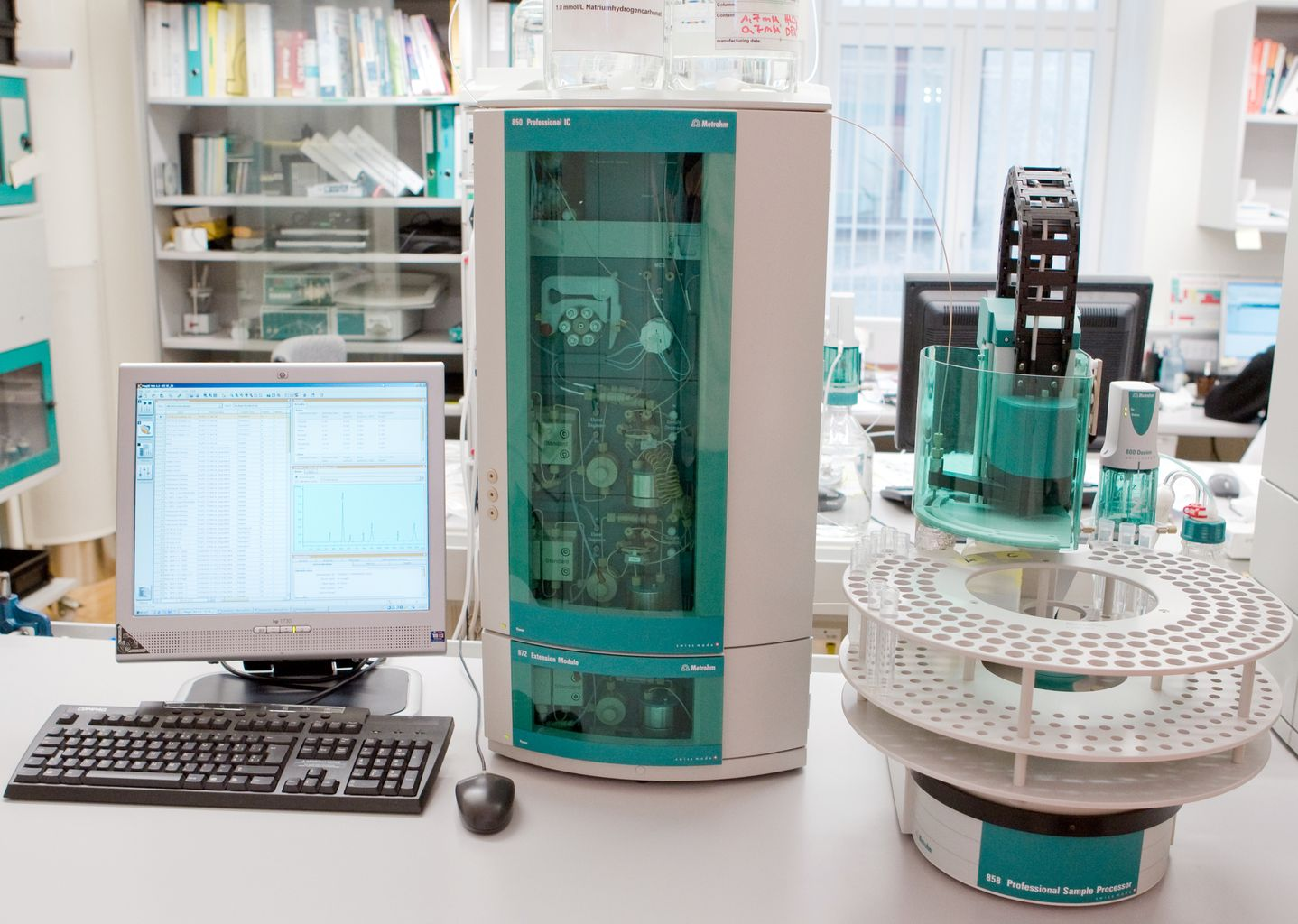
A Metrohm ion chromatography workstation

Automated 894 Professional CVS

Metrohm was founded in 1943 in Herisau by Bertold Suhner and Willi Studer. At the outset, the company produced measuring instruments for high-frequency technology and telecommunications. High-precision measuring instruments as well as radio receivers were added to its product range later on.

After World War II, the company struggled as the demand for their products decreased, since it was cheaper to buy imported radios from the US. Thus, Suhner decided to venture into analytical chemistry and developed a first pH meter in 1947, followed by a titrator in 1949.

In 1947, Suhner and Studer parted ways. Swiss journalist and author Peter Holenstein describes how this happened in his book on the lifework of co-founder Willi Studer: In June 1947, Emil Haefely, founder of the company Emil Haefely & Cie AG, which was one of Metrohm's first customers, asked Willi Studer, whom he had known for many years, to build a prototype for a cathode-ray oscilloscope. This being new technology for Metrohm, Bertold Suhner opposed the idea, fearing that the development wouldn't be possible within reasonable time and budget constraints. Indeed, while the development of the simpler instruments in Metrohm's portfolio had never taken Studer more than a few weeks, Studer still hadn't finished the prototype after several months at the end of November 1947. At this point, his colleague Suhner lost all hope that the project would come to a successful conclusion. A break between the co-founders was the result, and led Studer to leave the company at the end of December 1947. From then on, Suhner ran the business by himself. Studer, on the other hand, went on to found his own company "Willi Studer", known as Studer today and famous for its audio equipment.

In 1968, Bertold Suhner resigned from his post in the operational management of Metrohm and became strongly committed to the environment. He even fought for causes that could harm his own company, making it a difficult time for the new managing directors Lorenz Kuhn and Hans Winzeler. As a result of his intransigence in environmental matters, he also alienated friends, leaving him socially isolated towards the end of his life.

Since 1982, Metrohm AG has been a full subsidiary of the Metrohm Foundation, which is the only shareholder of Metrohm AG. Metrohm co-founder Bertold Suhner put the foundation in place to ensure independence and thereby maintain the ability to make unswayed decisions. The foundation is not only dedicated to the operation of Metrohm AG, but also to charitable and cultural purposes. For example, in 1999, the Metrohm Foundation equipped the public gymnasium Kantonsschule Trogen in the Swiss town of Trogen with internet access and more than 100 computer workstations to ensure that the public school can keep up with international standards. It has also endowed a professorship for the research on new materials at the Zurich University of Applied Sciences since 2014.

Until 2006, 36 subsidiaries had been founded. For the most part, these are situated abroad and form a worldwide support and sales network. Research and development as well as production, however, remain at the Herisau site.

Metrohm AG moved from the town center of Herisau in 2011 to its new premises in the industrial zone "Hölzli". The new premises were expanded in 2015 to accommodate the growing number of employees. In summer 2024, Metrohm expanded its Herisau campus by an additional 20,000 square meters. In 2025, Metrohm established new subsidiaries in Korea, Portugal and Ghana.

== Company structure ==
Metrohm is a stock corporation headquartered in Herisau, Switzerland. It is owned by the Metrohm Foundation, which ensures the company's independence.

Metrohm is present in around 80 countries through subsidiaries or distribution partners. Amongst others, Metrohm holds the following specialized development and production sites:

- Metroglas (Switzerland) manufactures electrochemical and optical sensors for laboratory and process analysis.
- Metrohm Process Analytics (Netherlands) develops and manufactures online analyzers for the process industry.
- Metrohm Autolab (Netherlands) develops modular electrochemical measuring instruments, especially for spectroelectrochemistry, corrosion, and battery research.
- Metrohm DropSens (Spain) produces tools for electrochemical analysis, especially screen-printed electrodes and portable electrochemical instruments.
- Innovative Photonic Solutions (USA) develops stabilized laser sources for Raman spectroscopy.
- Metrohm Spectro (USA) manufactures Raman instruments and components, including lasers and high-performance semiconductor diode light source systems.

As of 2021, the company generated revenue of more than 400 million Swiss francs. As of 2024, Metrohm employs around 3,200 people worldwide, including approximately 700 at its headquarters in Herisau.

== Product lines ==
Metrohm develops and sells analysis instruments for various chemical analysis techniques:

- Titration: Metrohm offers different titration systems, including potentiometric, thermometric, and Karl Fischer titrators. The Omnis software provides a modular and scalable framework for titration workflows, including options for integrated sample handling and digital data management.
- Ion chromatography (IC): Metrohm provides instruments for determining anions, cations, and organic substances at trace and ultra-trace levels, used in industries such as pharmaceuticals, chemicals, and environmental analysis.
- Electrochemistry and Voltammetry: Metrohm supplies potentiostats, galvanostats, and accessories for electrochemical research and trace analysis of metals.
- Spectroscopy: The company's spectroscopy range includes instruments for near-infrared (NIR) and Raman spectroscopy, such as portable and laboratory Raman analyzers and NIR spectrometers.
- Process analytics: Metrohm offers modular systems for real-time online monitoring of industrial processes using titration, ion chromatography, and spectroscopy.

Metrohm collaborates with external partners to develop fully automated laboratory robots for sample preparation and analysis. Metrohm also offers pH meters, conductivity meters, dosing systems, and software for data management and compliance.
