= Theodore Kuwana =

Japanese American chemist (1931–2022)

Theodore (Ted) Kuwana Emeritus Distinguished Professor and Regents Distinguished Professor
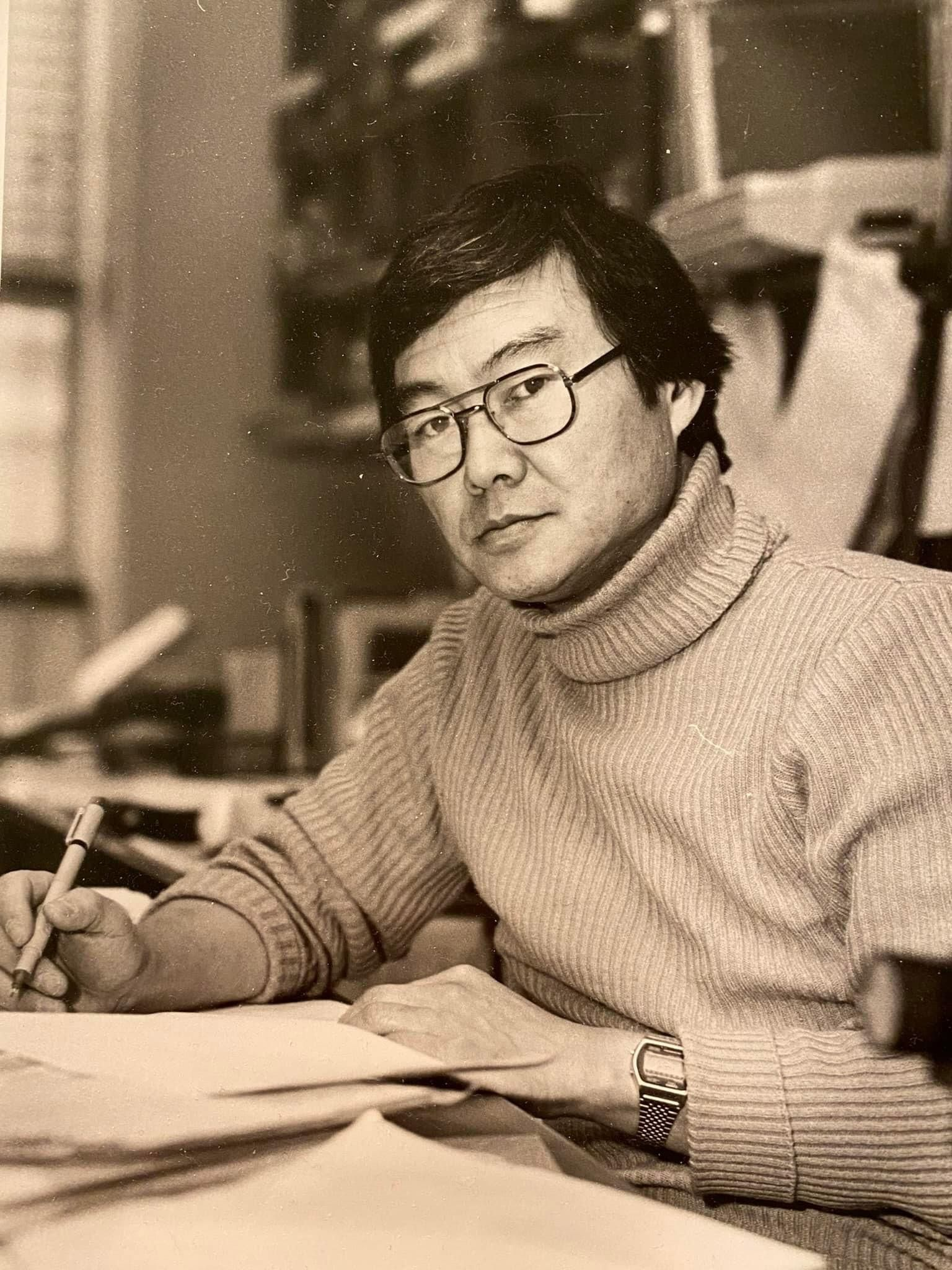
- Born: August 3, 1931; Idaho Falls, Idaho
- Died: January 1, 2022 (aged 90); Seattle, Washington
- Other names: Known to his students as "TK"
- Education: B.S. Antioch College, 1954; M.S. Cornell University, 1956; Ph.D. University of Kansas, 1959
- Occupation(s): Scientific researcher, chemistry professor
- Known for: Spectroelectrochemistry
- Children: One son, one daughter, and four granddaughters
- Scientific career
- Institutions: California Institute of Technology; University of California, Riverside; Case Institute of Technology; Ohio State University; University of Kansas
- Thesis: Studies in Electroanalytical Chemistry: The Development of a Mercury Chloride Film Anode and Chronopotentiometric Studies in Aqueous and Non-aqueous Solutions. (1959)
- Doctoral advisor: Ralph N. Adams

Theodore Kuwana (1931–2022) was a chemist and academic researcher known as the founding father of the field of spectroelectrochemistry.

Kuwana's academic career included appointments at California Institute of Technology, the University of California, Riverside, Case Institute of Technology, Ohio State University, and finally at the University of Kansas. At KU, he was Regents Distinguished Professor of Chemistry and Pharmaceutical Chemistry, the Director of the Center for Bioanalytical Research, and Emeritus Distinguished Professor. He served as managing director of the Analytical Sciences Digital Library.

During his career, Kuwana mentored more than 70 graduate students.

== Early life and education ==
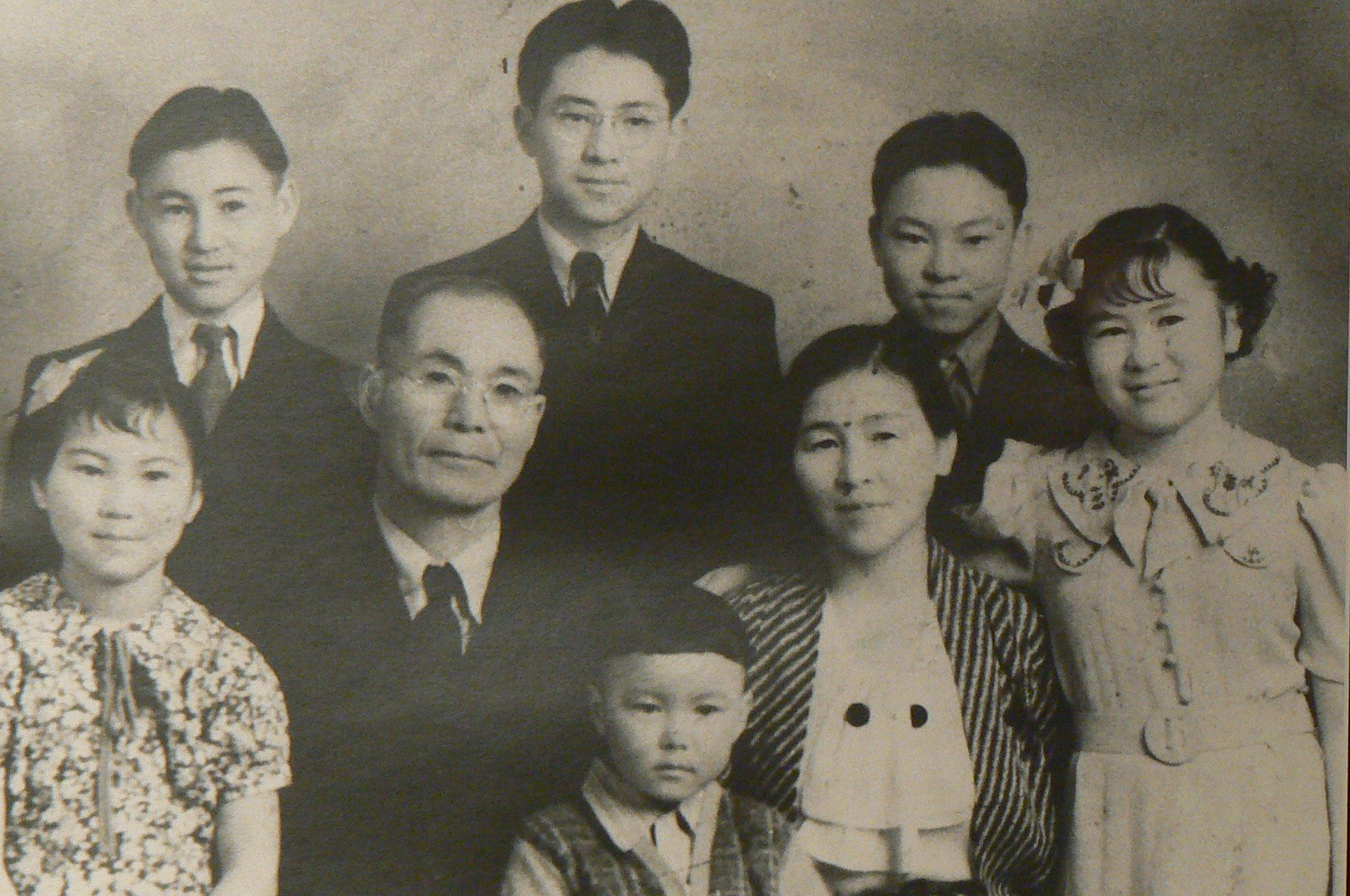
Kuwana family. Theodore is at bottom, center.

Theodore Kuwana, a son of Japanese immigrant (Issei) parents Yoshino and Nenokichi Kuwana, was born August 3, 1931, in Idaho Falls, Idaho, in the United States.

Kuwana wrote, "I was the youngest of six children; my parents were immigrant tenant potato farmers... When I was 10 and 12, I lost my father and mother, respectively, to cancer. Early on, mother had said, 'You must go to college.' I was the only one in our family to do so." His interest in chemistry started while he was in elementary school, when he was given a Gilbert chemistry set one Christmas. In high school he won the Bausch & Lomb Medal for Excellence in chemistry.

Kuwana's baccalaureate degree in 1954 was from Antioch College where with R.G. Yalman he published his first research article in a major journal. His M.S. in 1956 was from Cornell University. Kuwana earned his Ph.D. in 1959 at the University of Kansas, with a dissertation titled, Studies in Electroanalytical Chemistry: The Development of a Mercury Chloride Film Anode and Chronopotentiometric Studies in Aqueous and Non-aqueous Solutions, supervised by Ralph N. Adams.

In 1965, Kuwana wed Jane Bader. Because she understood the chemistry and was also a talented writer and editor, she edited his writings. The couple had a son, a daughter, and four granddaughters.

== Career ==
After postdoctoral training with Fred Anson at California Institute of Technology, Kuwana briefly worked at an aerospace firm before he went to the University of California, Riverside, in 1960 as a visiting assistant professor. He became an associate professor at Case Institute of Technology (now Case Western Reserve University) in 1965, and a full professor there in 1968. From 1971–1986 he was on the faculty of Ohio State University. Kuwana joined the faculty at the University of Kansas in 1986, becoming Regents Distinguished Professor of Chemistry and Pharmaceutical Chemistry, and the Director of the Center for Bioanalytical Research.

Kuwana is recognized as the founding father of spectroelectrochemistry:

The origin of spectroelectrochemistry at an OTE [optically transparent electrode] appears to date from a conversation held at the University of Kansas in the late 1950's between young assistant professor Ralph Adams and his first graduate student Ted Kuwana. As recalled by Kuwana, Adams, while observing the production of an intense yellow color in the solution near a platinum anode during the oxidation of o-tolidine commented that "...it would be nice to have a 'see through' electrode to spectrally identify the colored species being formed..." Later, Kuwana obtained samples of a conducting glass (antimony doped tin oxide-coated glass), and the first spectroelectrochemistry at an OTE was performed on o-tolidine.

— William R. Heineman

Now equipped with a "see through" electrode, Kuwana and his students used these conducting glass OTEs for the first spectroelectrochemical experiments of electrogenerated solution species. Graduate student Keith Darlington and undergraduate student Don Leedy performed the experiments using o-tolidine, a colorless compound that undergoes a 2-electron oxidation to form an intensely yellow colored species – the very reaction that Kuwana studied as a graduate student at Kansas that sparked Adams' prophetic comment. They monitored formation of the yellow species at 437 nm using a constant anodic current (i. e., chronopotentiometry – a technique that was more commonly used at the time than it is now) and reported the results in their classic 1964 paper.

— William R. Heineman, Nicholas Winograd, William B. Jensen

Describing Kuwana's "profound impact on analytical chemistry education", Wenzel, et al., wrote that Kuwana set up a series of workshops with industrial leaders to evaluate the undergraduate analytical sciences curriculum and design improvements. The main recommendation from the workshop participants was that "the undergraduate analytical sciences curriculum needed to engage students in problem-based experiences in the classroom and laboratory portion of courses."

The workshop participants also recommended a digital library of resources and links to resources for instructors designing problem-based learning for lectures and laboratories. Kuwana partnered with the American Chemical Society, Division of Analytical Chemistry, to set up a partnership for educational outreach. The Analytical Sciences Digital Library (ASDL) was formed, and it was supported with funding from the National Science Foundation. Kuwana served as managing director. Editor Cynthia Larive acknowledged "the leadership and continued contributions of Professor Emeritus Ted Kuwana, University of Kansas, to the development and continued evolution of the ASDL project".

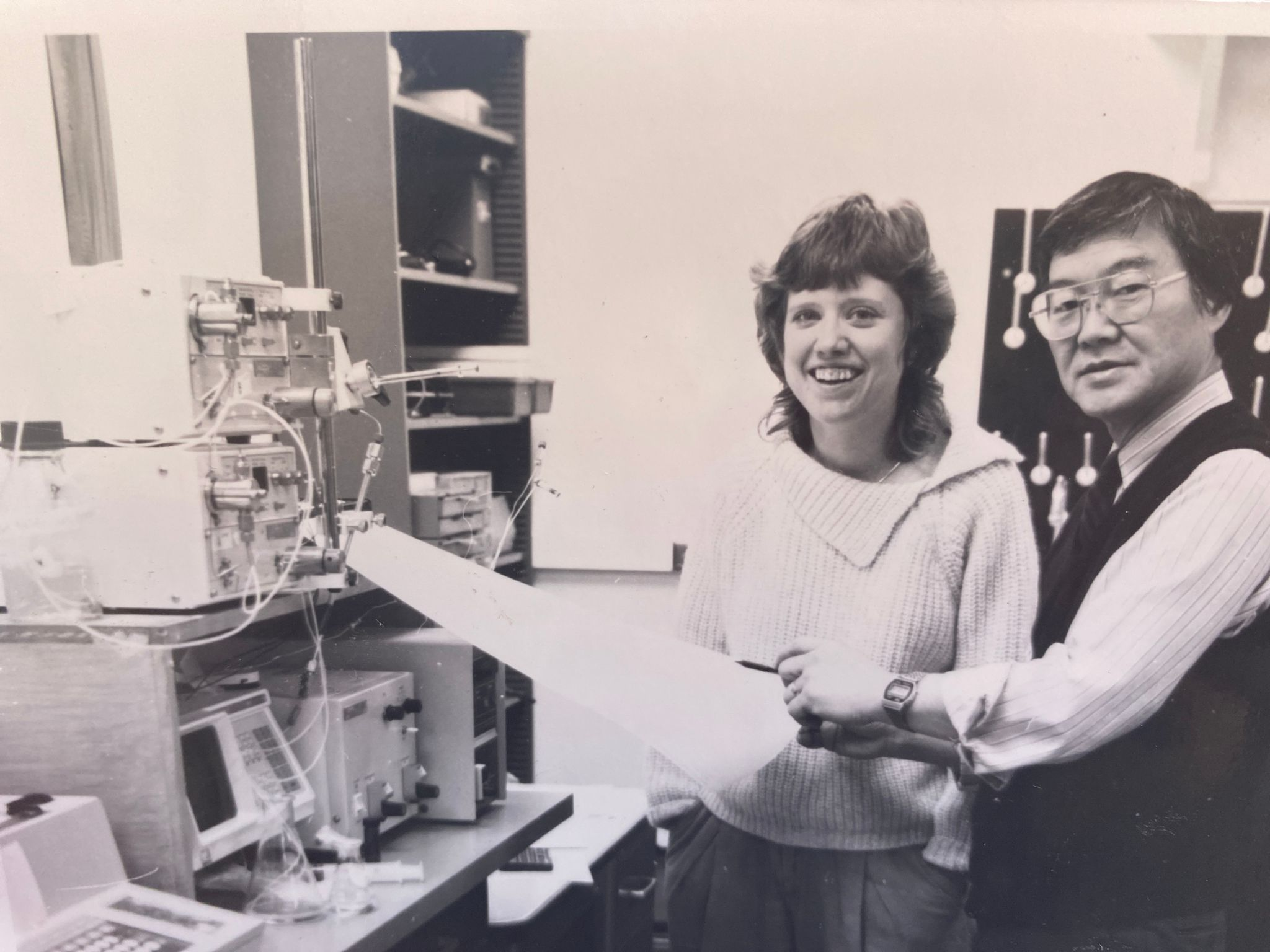
Ted Kuwana in lab with Susan M. Lunte

According to Richard L. McCreery, "Ted Kuwana was not only a scientific leader in electrochemistry and related fields, but he was also an excellent citizen and unselfish contributor to the careers of many other scientists, myself included." Over his career, Kuwana advised and mentored 73 graduate students.

Kuwana died of pneumonia in Seattle on January 1, 2022, at age 90 years.

== Selected publications ==
=== Articles ===
- Kuwana, Theodore.; Darlington, R. K.; Leedy, D. W. (September 1, 1964). "Electrochemical Studies Using Conducting Glass Indicator Electrodes". Analytical Chemistry. 36 (10): 2023–2025. doi:10.1021/ac60216a003. ISSN 0003-2700.
- Hansen, W. N.; Osteryoung, R. A.; Kuwana, Theodore (March 1966). "Internal Reflection Spectroscopic Observation of Electrode-Solution Interface". Journal of the American Chemical Society. 88 (5): 1062–1063. Bibcode:1966JAChS..88.1062H. doi:10.1021/ja00957a040. ISSN 0002-7863.
- Hansen, Wilford Nels.; Kuwana, Theodore.; Osteryoung, Robert A. (December 1, 1966). "Observation of electrode-solution interface by means of internal reflection spectrometry". Analytical Chemistry. 38 (13): 1810–1821. doi:10.1021/ac50155a035. ISSN 0003-2700.
- Kuwana, Theodore; Bublitz, Donald E.; Hoh, George (November 1960). "Chronopotentiometric Studies on the Oxidation of Ferrocene, Ruthenocene, Osmocene and Some of their Derivatives 1". Journal of the American Chemical Society. 82 (22): 5811–5817. Bibcode:1960JAChS..82.5811K. doi:10.1021/ja01507a011. ISSN 0002-7863.
- Hawkridge, Fred M.; Kuwana, Theodore. (June 1, 1973). "Indirect coulometric titration of biological electron transport components". Analytical Chemistry. 45 (7): 1021–1027. doi:10.1021/ac60329a038. ISSN 0003-2700. PMID 4356378.
- Lin, Albert W. C.; Armstrong, Neal R.; Kuwana, Theodore. (July 1, 1977). "X-ray photoelectron/Auger electron spectroscopic studies of tin and indium metal foils and oxides". Analytical Chemistry. 49 (8): 1228–1235. doi:10.1021/ac50016a042. ISSN 0003-2700.
- Yeh, Peter; Kuwana, Theodore (October 5, 1977). "Reversible Electrode Reaction of Cytichrome C". Chemistry Letters. 6 (10): 1145–1148. doi:10.1246/cl.1977.1145. ISSN 0366-7022.
- Tse, Daniel Chi-Sing.; Kuwana, Theodore. (August 1, 1978). "Electrocatalysis of dihydronicotinamide adenosine diphosphate with quinones and modified quinone electrodes". Analytical Chemistry. 50 (9): 1315–1318. doi:10.1021/ac50031a030. ISSN 0003-2700.
- Jaegfeldt, Hans; Kuwana, Theodore; Johansson, Gillis (April 1983). "Electrochemical stability of catechols with a pyrene side chain strongly adsorbed on graphite electrodes for catalytic oxidation of dihydronicotinamide adenine dinucleotide". Journal of the American Chemical Society. 105 (7): 1805–1814. Bibcode:1983JAChS.105.1805J. doi:10.1021/ja00345a021. ISSN 0002-7863.
- Hu, Ing-Feng; Karweik, Dale H.; Kuwana, Theodore (June 25, 1985). "Activation and deactivation of glassy carbon electrodes". Journal of Electroanalytical Chemistry and Interfacial Electrochemistry. 188 (1): 59–72. doi:10.1016/S0022-0728(85)80050-4. ISSN 0022-0728.
- Fagan, Dan T.; Hu, Ing Feng.; Kuwana, Theodore. (December 1, 1985). "Vacuum heat-treatment for activation of glassy carbon electrodes". Analytical Chemistry. 57 (14): 2759–2763. doi:10.1021/ac00291a006. ISSN 0003-2700.
- Kost, Kent M.; Bartak, Duane E.; Kazee, Beth.; Kuwana, Theodore. (November 1, 1988). "Electrodeposition of platinum microparticles into polyaniline films with electrocatalytic applications". Analytical Chemistry. 60 (21): 2379–2384. doi:10.1021/ac00172a012. ISSN 0003-2700.
- Marioli, Juan M.; Kuwana, Theodore (June 1, 1992). "Electrochemical characterization of carbohydrate oxidation at copper electrodes". Electrochimica Acta. 37 (7): 1187–1197. doi:10.1016/0013-4686(92)85055-P. ISSN 0013-4686.

=== Books ===
- Kuwana, T., ed. (1978). Physical Methods in Modern Chemical Analysis. Vol. 1. Academic Press. doi:10.1021/ed057pA58.2. ISBN 978-0-12-433255-3. ISSN 0021-9584.
- Kuwana, T., ed. (2012). Physical Methods in Modern Chemical Analysis. Vol. 2. Elsevier. ISBN 978-0-12-431296-8.

== Patents ==
- Method for oxidation of and element in both compartments of and electrolytic cell, (1984).
- Electrodes for use in electrocatalytic processes, (1985).
- Electrochemical detector for liquid chromatographic analysis of carbohydrates, (1991).

== Awards and honors ==
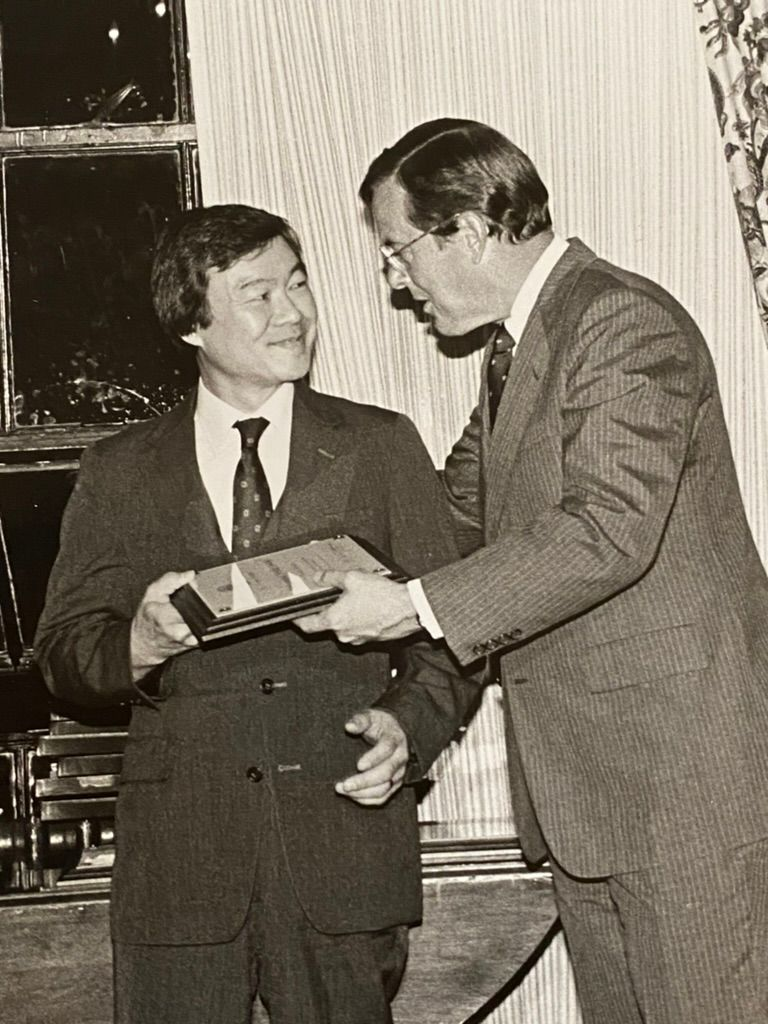
Theodore Kuwana receiving award.

- Fellow, American Chemical Society (2011)
- American Chemical Society Division of Analytical Chemistry, J. Calvin Giddings Award for Excellence in Education (2004)
- NSF Established Program to Stimulate Competitive Research Foundation Lifetime Achievement Award (2002)
- American Chemical Society Division of Analytical Chemistry Award in Electrochemistry (1995)
- The Japan Society for Analytical Chemistry Honorary Membership and Medal (1991)
- Society of Electroanalytical Chemists C.N. Reilly Award (1989)
- Kuwana was honored with a special tribute issue of the journal Electroanalysis, "in recognition of his 50+ years of seminal contributions to the fields of electroanalytical chemistry, spectroelectrochemistry, analytical and bioanalytical chemistry, and analytical chemistry education."
- The Kuwana & Sawyer Undergraduate Award in Analytical Chemistry Fund has been established to finance scholarships at the University of California, Riverside, for undergraduates "conducting research or studies in analytical chemistry, with preference to those pursuing the field of electrochemistry".

== See also ==
- Electroanalytical methods
- Electrochemistry
- Spectroscopy
