= SOER =

SOER may refer to:

- Sustaining Oklahoma's Energy Resources
- Special Operations Engineer Regiment (Australia)
- State and Outlook of Europe's Environment, a report published by the European Environment Agency

== See also ==
- Soers
- Soer-Varanger
- Soer-Trondelag
- Seur
- Surface-Oxidation-Enhanced Raman Scattering (SOERS), a Raman spectroelectrochemistry method
- Soeur (disambiguation)
