= Diboryne =

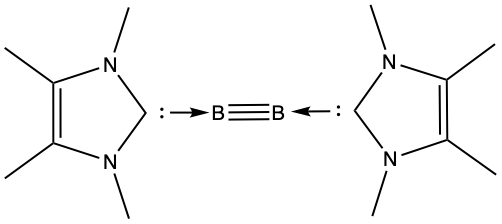
- Boron–boron triple bond (B≡B) stabilized by N-heterocyclic carbenes (NHCs)

Names
- IUPAC name boranylidyneborane

Identifiers
CAS Number	14452-61-0
3D model (JSmol)	Interactive image
PubChem CID	6328200
- InChI: InChI=1S/B2/c1-2 Key: ZOCHARZZJNPSEU-UHFFFAOYSA-N
- SMILES: B#B

Properties
Chemical formula	B_{2}
Molar mass	21.63 g/mol
- Except where otherwise noted, data are given for materials in their standard state (at 25 °C [77 °F], 100 kPa). Infobox references

Diborynes are low-valent main-group compounds that contain a formal boron–boron triple bond (B≡B). In most isolable examples, the B≡B unit is stabilized by strong σ-donor ligands and is often described as L→B≡B←L; N-heterocyclic carbenes (NHCs) are among the most common supporting ligands. Structurally, many diborynes exhibit an approximately linear B–B ligand arrangement, which makes them a useful point of comparison to other main-group multiple-bond systems where π-bonding can be harder to sustain.

Their bonding description has been examined extensively. While the B≡B linkage is commonly discussed in terms of a σ bond and two π interactions, experimental and theoretical work has emphasized that ligand donation plays an important role in stabilizing this framework, and that the B–B multiple bond is generally weaker than the C≡C bond in alkynes. At the same time, diborynes can retain low-lying acceptor character at boron, which helps explain their tendency to engage in donor–acceptor interactions and their broader reactivity patterns.

Reactivity is often centered at the B≡B unit and includes multi-electron addition and insertion processes (for example, chalcogen insertion), as well as small-molecule transformations that are uncommon for typical p-block compounds, such as metal-free CO binding and coupling in selected systems. Diborynes and related π-complexes can also show distinctive photophysical behavior, and some reported complexes display strong room-temperature phosphorescence. Since the first isolable, fully characterized diboryne was reported in 2012, a range of synthetic approaches and reactivity motifs have been developed, allowing these compounds to be discussed in terms of synthesis, bonding, reactivity, and photophysical properties.

== Synthesis ==
=== First reported synthetic method ===
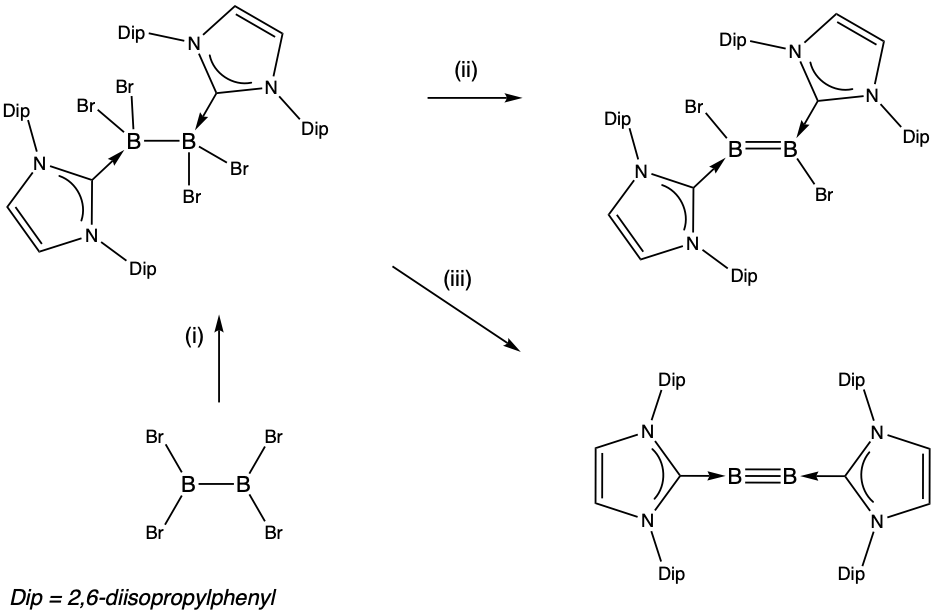
Reaction scheme for the stepwise reduction of an NHC-stabilized dibromodiborane precursor to give the first isolable diboryne, L→B≡B←L (L = NHC).

The first isolable diboryne was reported in 2012 by Braunschweig and co-workers. Their synthesis began from an NHC-stabilized dibromodiborane precursor; NHCs are neutral carbon-based ligands that donate a lone pair to boron and stabilize low-valent centers. The precursor was reduced stepwise, commonly using potassium graphite (KC_{8}) as a strong electron-transfer reductant, to remove the halides and generate the neutral NHC→B≡B←NHC complex under inert conditions. The product was characterized by multinuclear NMR spectroscopy, UV–vis absorption, and single-crystal X-ray diffraction, with a short B–B distance and near-linear geometry consistent with a formal B≡B description.

=== Synthetic developments ===
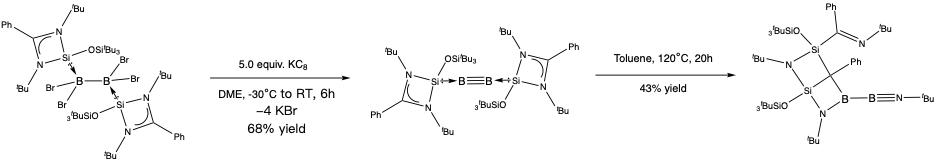
Reaction scheme for a silylene-stabilized diboryne, illustrating an alternative to NHC-based stabilization of the B≡B unit.

Since the first isolable diboryne was reported, most well-characterized examples have still relied on strongly donating ligands to stabilize the electron-deficient boron centers. As a result, the number of distinct synthetic families remains relatively small, and many efforts have focused on changing the supporting donor framework to tune the electronics at the B≡B core.

One notable advance was the preparation of a silylene-stabilized diboryne. A silylene is a low-valent silicon(II) donor that can bind through a lone pair, and it is often described as ambiphilic, meaning it can both donate and accept electron density depending on the bonding situation. This study provided a crystallographically characterized diboryne that is not supported by a classical NHC ligand, showing that the B≡B unit can persist under a broader set of donor environments than initially demonstrated.

Another direction used mesoionic carbenes (MICs). MICs are carbenes with delocalized charge distribution, and they are often stronger σ-donors than typical NHCs; σ-donation here refers to donation of a lone pair into an empty orbital on boron. In addition, MICs can display π-acceptor character, meaning they can accept electron density into low-lying empty orbitals, which can further shape the frontier orbital energies of the diboryne. Diborynes supported by MICs therefore offer an electronically distinct class of B≡B compounds relative to the original NHC-stabilized systems.

Computational work has also proposed new design motifs for stabilizing diborynes. Density functional theory (DFT), a quantum-chemical method used to estimate electronic structure and energetics, has been applied to multitopic carbene frameworks, where a single ligand contains multiple donor sites that can bind cooperatively. These calculations suggest that such ligands could support larger assemblies built around B≡B motifs. Related DFT studies examined metallaborocyclic models, meaning ring systems that incorporate boron atoms and a metal center, to evaluate whether cyclic constraints and metal interaction can influence the stability and bonding description of a B–B triple bond. While these proposals do not automatically translate into straightforward laboratory syntheses, they help map out which electronic and structural features are most likely to expand the accessible chemistry of diborynes.

== Reactivity ==
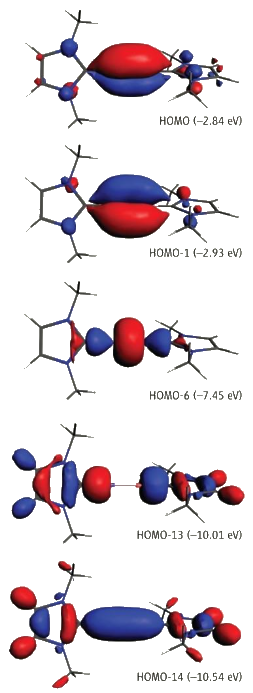
Molecular orbital isosurfaces of an NHC-stabilized diboryne highlighting π electron density along the B≡B bond and electron-poor regions at each boron.

=== Lewis acid-base adducts ===
Diborynes show noticeable Lewis acidity at both boron atoms, even though the B≡B unit is often drawn as a linear triple bond. A Lewis acid is a species that accepts an electron pair, and in diborynes this acceptor behavior is associated with electron-poor regions at boron and low-lying empty orbitals that can accommodate donation from neutral bases. In simple terms, each boron can provide an acceptor site, so a single diboryne can bind one or two donor ligands depending on steric and electronic factors.

This Lewis acidity explains the formation of donor–acceptor adducts with common neutral donors such as pyridines, phosphines, or additional carbenes. In many cases, adduct formation perturbs the B–B distance only modestly and preserves an approximately linear B≡B core, consistent with the idea that coordination can occur without fully destroying the underlying σ and π bonding pattern.

In addition to these "classical" base adducts, diborynes also form π-complexes with electrophilic main-group fragments and with transition metal centers. These interactions are often discussed using the same donation and back-donation picture used for alkyne complexes, where the B≡B π system can donate electron density to the Lewis-acidic partner, while the diboryne can also accept electron density into low-lying acceptor orbitals. In this sense, diboryne units can show Z-type ligand character (a Z-type ligand is an acceptor-only ligand that takes electron density from the metal or electrophile), particularly in π-complexes where metal-to-diboryne electron donation is significant.

=== Bond strength and bonding analysis ===
Structural data provide the most direct starting point for discussing bonding in diborynes. In the first structurally authenticated NHC→B≡B←NHC complex, single-crystal X-ray diffraction revealed a markedly shortened B–B distance relative to typical B–B single bonds and an approximately linear arrangement at the B≡B core. Across related NHC-stabilized systems, crystallographic metrics generally show that coordination at boron can lengthen the B–B distance slightly, but the overall geometry often remains close to linear, which is consistent with the presence of two mutually orthogonal π interactions.

Electronic-structure analyses support a bonding description that includes one σ bond and two π components along the B–B axis. In this context, a "bonding orbital" is a molecular orbital that places electron density between two atoms and stabilizes their connection. Computations on NHC→B≡B←NHC frameworks identify three principal B–B bonding orbitals consistent with a σ+2π picture, while also emphasizing that strong ligand donation significantly shapes the electronic structure. Several studies therefore treat the NHCs not only as spectators but as key stabilizing partners that donate electron density into low-lying acceptor orbitals at boron and help maintain a short, linear B–B linkage. Quantitative bond indices such as the Wiberg bond index (a computed measure of bond order, where larger values indicate greater bonding interaction) have been used to evaluate the extent of multiple-bond character in these systems, and different metrics can place the effective bond order between idealized "double" and "triple" limits depending on how electron sharing and polarization are partitioned.

Bond strength measurements and thermochemical interpretations highlight an important distinction between structural multiple-bond character and intrinsic bond energy. Experimental assessment of B–B triple-bond strengths, along with thermodynamic and force-field based analyses, indicates that the B≡B linkage in carbene-stabilized diborynes is substantially weaker than a C≡C bond in alkynes. This apparent paradox is resolved by recognizing that overall stability reflects both the B–B interaction and the substantial stabilizing effect of ligand coordination. In other words, strong donor ligands can make diborynes isolable even when the intrinsic B–B multiple bond is comparatively weak, and changes in ligand donor/acceptor properties can tune both bonding descriptors and reactivity of the B≡B unit.

=== Chalcogen insertion reactions ===
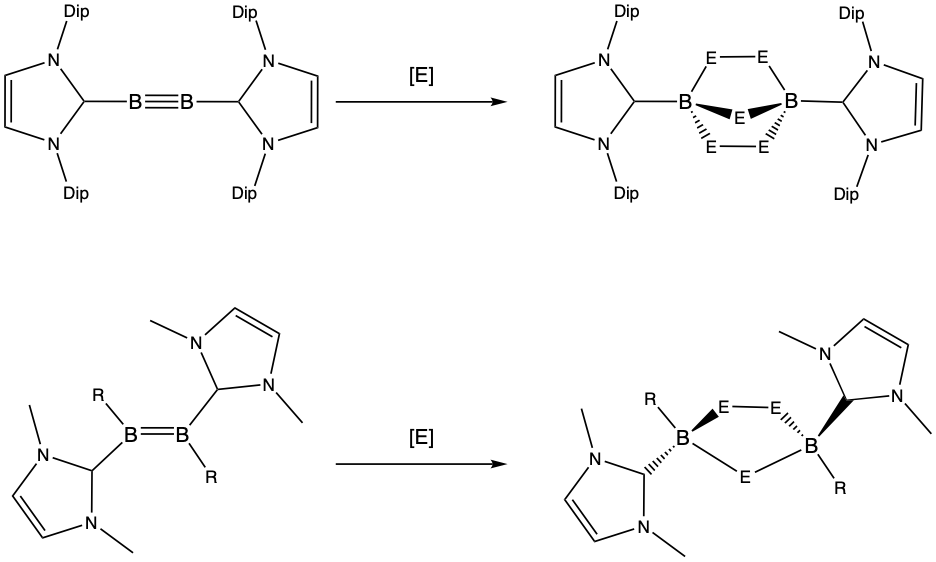
Reductive insertion of elemental chalcogens (S, Se, or Te) into an NHC→B≡B←NHC diboryne.

Diborynes undergo reductive insertion reactions with elemental chalcogens. Chalcogen are Group 16 elements, and in this context sulfur (S), selenium (Se), and tellurium (Te) can insert into the B–B multiple bond. These transformations are typically described as multi-electron additions at the B≡B unit, and they convert the diboryne into a three-membered B–E–B ring (E = S, Se, Te).

Structural characterization shows that chalcogen insertion changes both connectivity and bonding metrics. Insertion replaces the direct B≡B linkage with two B–E bonds, and the B-B separation increases relative to the parent diboryne as the bonding is redistributed across the new B–E–B framework. Spectroscopic changes accompanying insertion provide complementary evidence for this redistribution of electron density. The new products show distinct signals compared with the starting diboryne, consistent with formation of a cyclic B–E–B motif and altered boron electronic environments. Because the B≡B core can accommodate these net redox changes without uncontrolled decomposition, chalcogen insertion has become a convenient benchmark reaction for comparing how different diborynes respond to multi-electron bond-forming processes.

=== Hydroboration and formation of boron clusters ===
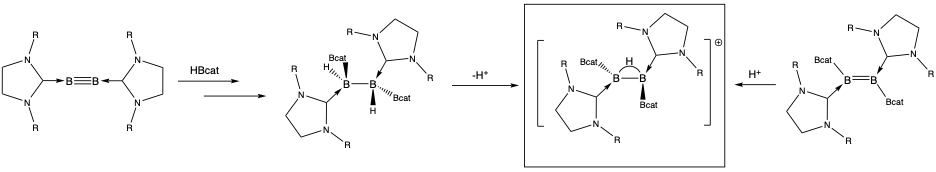
Single and double hydroboration of an NHC-stabilized diboryne with catecholborane (HBcat, a hydridoborane), showing stepwise addition at the B≡B unit and formation of a cationic tetraborane cluster after hydride abstraction.

Diborynes undergo clean hydroboration with hydridoboranes. Hydroboration is the addition of a B–H bond across a multiple bond, and in diborynes the B≡B unit can accept this two-electron addition in a controlled, stepwise fashion. In a single hydroboration reaction, one equivalent of a monohydridoborane such as catecholborane (HBcat) adds across the B≡B framework to give a B–B(H)(BR) product that retains residual multiple-bond character. This selectivity is notable because it shows that addition can occur without immediately scrambling the B–B bonding framework into ill-defined oligomers.

Under stronger conditions or with excess hydroborating reagent, diborynes can undergo double hydroboration. In this case, a second B–H addition further reduces and functionalizes the B–B unit, and the resulting products can be viewed as formal incorporation of two boron and two hydrogen atoms into the original B≡B motif. Several of the observed intermediates converge to the same cationic tetraborane after hydride abstraction. Hydride abstraction is the removal of H^{-}, and it is often used to generate cationic boron clusters from neutral precursors. These convergent pathways illustrate how diborynes can serve as modular building blocks for small polyboron frameworks, linking simple addition chemistry to the formation of defined boron clusters.

=== Carbon monoxide binding and coupling ===
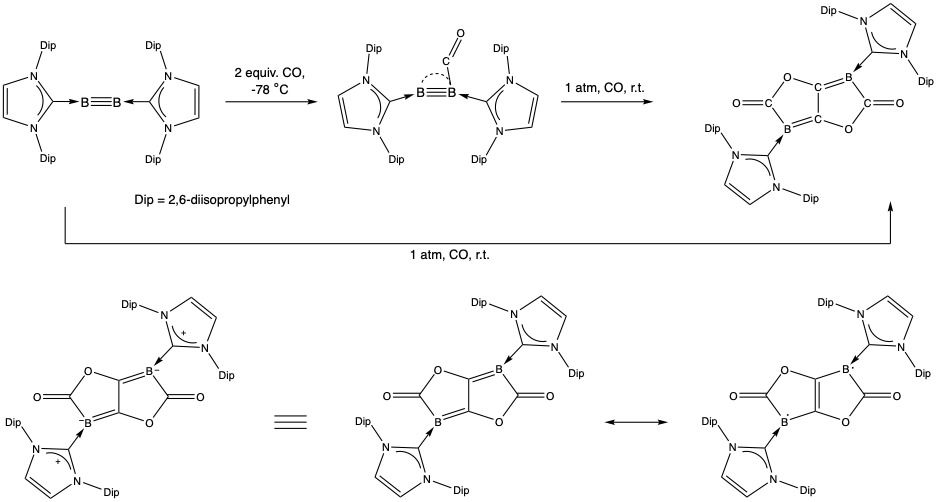
Metal-free binding and coupling of carbon monoxide (CO) at a diboryne, illustrating formation of B–C and C–C bonds from CO at the B≡B unit.

One of the most striking reactivity patterns of diborynes is their ability to bind carbon monoxide (CO) and promote C–C bond formation without a transition metal center. In coordination chemistry, CO activation is often associated with metal-to-CO back-donation. Back-donation is electron flow from a filled orbital into an antibonding orbital of CO, which weakens the C–O bond and enables further transformation. In diboryne systems, related electron-transfer and polarization effects can be achieved through the combination of a π-rich B≡B unit and low-lying acceptor character at boron, allowing CO to be captured and rearranged at the diboryne framework.[7][21]

In representative NHC-stabilized diborynes, exposure to CO can lead to coupled products in which new B–C bonds are formed and two CO-derived fragments are joined to give a C–C linkage. These outcomes are commonly described as CO coupling at the B≡B unit and they provide a clear example of "transition metal like" bond construction in a p-block setting.[7] Related studies have also examined CO fixation, where CO is incorporated into isolable boron-containing products rather than simply binding reversibly.[21]

The donor environment around the diboryne can strongly influence CO chemistry. A bis(silylene)-supported diboryne has been shown to engage in metal-free CO binding and coupling as well. A silylene is a low-valent silicon(II) donor that can stabilize electron-poor boron centers, and changing from NHC to silylene support alters the frontier orbital energies of the B≡B unit, which in turn can shift the balance between simple binding, coupling, and downstream rearrangement pathways. Together, these results establish CO binding and coupling as a benchmark transformation for comparing how ligand frameworks tune the electronic structure and reactivity of diborynes.

== Photophysical properties ==
Many diborynes display characteristic optical absorption in the UV visible region that can be assigned to transitions involving the B≡B π system.[4][5] In simple molecular-orbital terms, these bands are often discussed as π→π* excitations. The HOMO and LUMO are the highest occupied and lowest unoccupied molecular orbitals, and the HOMO–LUMO gap provides a convenient way to describe the energy required for an electronic excitation. When ligand frameworks stabilize low-lying acceptor orbitals at boron, the HOMO–LUMO gap can decrease, which commonly leads to a red-shift of absorption features.

Substituent and ligand effects can be pronounced. Diborynes incorporated into more extended conjugated frameworks show altered absorption profiles compared with simpler NHC-stabilized systems, consistent with greater delocalization of π-electron density across the supporting scaffold. Coordination at the diboryne unit can similarly change the energies and compositions of frontier orbitals, so optical spectra can provide a practical readout of how strongly the supporting donors perturb the B≡B electronic structure.

Photoluminescence has been reported in several diboryne-derived complexes, particularly in transition-metal π-complexes of B≡B units. In these systems, room-temperature phosphorescence has been observed. Phosphorescence is emission from a triplet excited state, and it is often enhanced when spin–orbit coupling is strong, which can occur in the presence of heavier atoms and certain metal centers. The resulting emission properties highlight that, beyond serving as bonding benchmarks, diboryne motifs can also act as tunable chromophoric units whose optical behavior depends sensitively on ligand environment and coordination chemistry.

== Conclusion ==
Diborynes are ligand-stabilized, low-valent boron compounds built around a formal B≡B unit. Their near linear geometries invite comparison to alkynes, but their bonding and stability depend much more strongly on donor ligands and the intrinsic electron deficiency of boron. Compared with many heavier main group multiple bond systems that commonly adopt trans-bent structures when π bonding is less effective, diborynes stand out as a rare case where a well-defined, isolable "triple-bond" motif can be examined systematically.

Across the known families, a consistent picture emerges: the B≡B framework combines multiple-bond character with accessible acceptor orbitals at boron. This balance accounts for their Lewis acidity and their ability to engage in adduct formation and small-molecule transformations that are often associated with transition metal chemistry. For this reason, diborynes have become benchmark systems in main-group multiple bonding and low-valent boron chemistry, linking clear structural metrics to tunable reactivity and, in some related complexes, distinctive photophysical behavior.
