= Cynthia Larive =

American chemist and UCSC Chancellor

11th Chancellor of the University of California, Santa Cruz
- Incumbent
- Assumed office July 1, 2019
- Preceded by: George R. Blumenthal

Personal details
- Born: 1957 (age 68–69)
- Education: South Dakota State University (BS); Purdue University (MS); University of California, Riverside (PhD)
- Scientific career
- Fields: Bioanalytical chemistry
- Workplaces: University of Kansas; University of California, Riverside; University of California, Santa Cruz
- Thesis: NMR studies of neurohypophyseal peptide hormones (1992)
- Doctoral advisor: Dallas L. Rabenstein

Cynthia Larive is an American scientist and academic administrator serving as the chancellor of University of California, Santa Cruz. Larive's research focuses on nuclear magnetic resonance spectroscopy (NMR) and mass spectrometry. She was previously a professor of chemistry and provost and executive vice chancellor at the University of California, Riverside. She is a fellow of AAAS, IUPAC and ACS, associate editor for the ACS journal Analytical Chemistry and editor of the Analytical Sciences Digital Library.

== Education ==
Larive received her Bachelor of Science from South Dakota State University in 1980, and her Master of Science degree from Purdue University in 1982. In 1992, she was awarded a Ph.D. in chemistry from the University of California, Riverside after working under the direction of Dallas L. Rabenstein.

== Career ==
Larive began her career as a professor in the chemistry department at the University of Kansas, and later joined the faculty of the University of California, Riverside, in 2005. Since 2004 she has served as the editor-in-chief of the Analytical Sciences Digital Library.

In February 2017, Larive was appointed interim provost and executive vice chancellor for University of California, Riverside, and the appointment was made permanent in October.

On May 16, 2019, Larive was announced as the new chancellor of University of California, Santa Cruz, succeeding George R. Blumenthal effective July 1.

== Research ==
Larive worked in the field of bioanalytical chemistry, applying analytical tools such as nuclear magnetic resonance spectroscopy (NMR) and mass spectrometry to the products of chemical separations. Much of her research focused on reducing the amount of sample needed for analysis, such as constructing microcoil NMR probes that can measure as little as 25 nL of sample and are usable as part of an capillary isotachophoresis apparatus. This has been applied to structure determination of heparin and heparan sulfate. She developed NMR pulse sequences to study protein ligand interactions in complexes with multiple ligands. She also researches analytical methods for metabolomics and chemogenomics for the reaction of plants to pesticides and hypoxia using NMR and mass spectroscopy.

NMR is often thought of as a low-sensitivity method, but Larive's laboratory has developed ways of increasing the sensitivity of their measurements to obtain precise chemical and structural information. The techniques she has developed are relevant to understanding carbohydrate structure and biosynthesis, designing new drugs and measuring the purity of pharmaceuticals. Her work in developing chemical profiles for substances also has relevance for the authentication of foodstuffs such as wine, olive oil, and pomegranate juice.

== Awards ==
Larive has received a number of awards, including the National Science Foundation CAREER Award in 1995. She received the American Chemical Society Analytical Division's J. Calvin Giddings Award for Excellence in Education in 2007 and served as chair of the Analytical Division in 2013. In 2015, Larive received the Award for Volunteer Service to the American Chemical Society. In 2018, the Analytical Chemistry Division of the American Chemical Society honored Larive with the Award for Distinguished Service to the Field of Analytical Chemistry.

Larive is a Fellow of the American Association for the Advancement of Science (AAAS) (2008), the International Union of Pure and Applied Chemistry (IUPAC) (2004) and the American Chemical Society (ACS) (2011).

== Controversies ==
Larive has been the subject of multiple recent controversies regarding her relationship with the student body at UC Santa Cruz. In the early morning hours of May 31, 2024, Larive authorized hundreds of police officers clad in riot gear from 13 different California police departments to disperse Pro-Palestinian protesters at the base of the UCSC campus. During this 9-hour long ordeal, a total of 122 students, faculty, staff, and community members were arrested and cited for a failure to disperse from an unlawful zone, along with others who received additional citations. Multiple students sustained injuries from their encounters with the police, including some who were hospitalized from what they characterized as excessive police force. Larive defended this decision calling it 'necessary to maintain campus safety,' and citing an incident in which an emergency medical vehicle was prevented from entering the campus to reach a toddler in distress due to the encampment. However, eyewitness testimony backed by video evidence points to police blockades preventing the emergency vehicle from entering campus, not the student protesters. Larive has been criticized by both students and faculty at UCSC for her handling of the Pro-Palestine encampment, including her refusal to attend the 2024 UCSC graduation ceremonies amid fears of student backlash to her actions.

On September 9, 2024, the ACLU of Northern California filed a lawsuit against Chancellor Larive and UC Santa Cruz for banning over 100 students and faculty from campus grounds. The UCSC police subjected every person who was arrested at the encampment to penal code 626.4, which allows school officials to “withdraw consent” to remain on campus for up to 2 weeks, a time frame that coincided with the end of the school term and graduation ceremonies for those arrested. The lawsuit states that these bans are “unconstitutional and overbroad, depriving students and faculty of their due process rights.” Normally, the school is required by law to hold a hearing before kicking a person off campus - unless that person ‘poses a substantial threat of significant injury to persons or property.’ As stated by the ACLU, “The University made no such findings here.”

Larive has also come under fire for an incident which happened in December 2023 in which a University campus loop bus crashed near the base of campus, injuring 5 students and resulting in the death of the bus driver. After inspecting the campus bus fleet, a California Highway Patrol report determined UCSC had 26 violations including brake issues on numerous busses, and classified 5 of the 9 campus busses as "Imminent Danger to Public Safety." CHP also noted University officials had knowingly failed to carry out required inspections including regular inspections on emergency exits. On August 6, 2024, UCSC released a report that an investigation conducted by the UC Santa Cruz Police Department found no evidence of mechanical failure on the bus that could have resulted in the December crash and therefore attributed it to driver error. Concerns over the safety of on-campus transportation remain in the student body, exacerbated by incidents such as a loop bus catching on fire while transporting students in November 2023.

In April 2022, Student Organizers hosted a rally at Kerr Hall over Chancellor Larive's raise of $105,286. Both graduate and undergraduate students protested the Chancellor's raise because of the rising cost of housing, homelessness and graduate student workers not receiving a cost of living adjustment (COLA).

Academic offices
Preceded by George R. Blumenthal	11th Chancellor of the University of California, Santa Cruz; 2019 – present	Incumbent
