= George R. Blumenthal =

American astrophysicist, astronomer and academic administrator (born 1945)

10th Chancellor of the University of California, Santa Cruz
- In office July 14, 2006 – June 30, 2019
- Preceded by: Denice Denton
- Succeeded by: Cynthia Larive

Personal details
- Born: October 20, 1945 (age 80) Milwaukee, Wisconsin, U.S.
- Spouse: Kelly Weisberg
- Education: University of Wisconsin–Milwaukee; University of California, San Diego
- Profession: astrophysicist, astronomer, professor
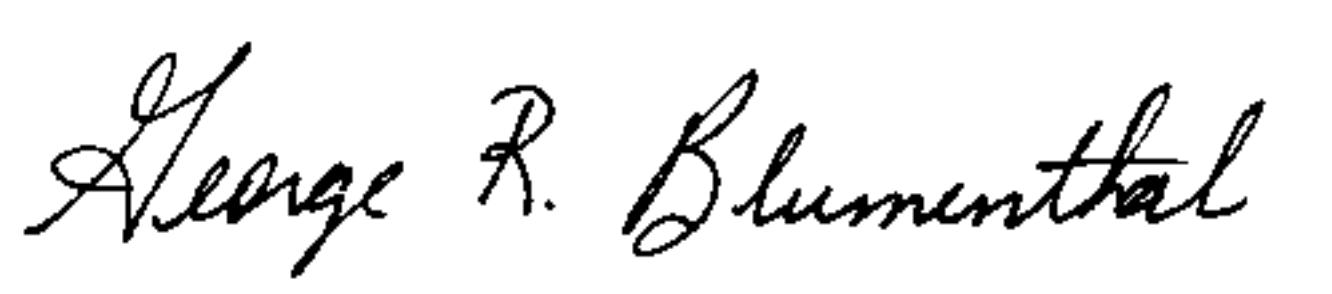
- Signature
- Scientific career
- Fields: Astrophysics
- Workplaces: University of California, Santa Cruz
- Thesis: The astrophysical applications of various high-energy electromagnetic phenomena (1971)
- Doctoral advisor: Robert J. Gould

George Ray Blumenthal (born October 20, 1945) is an American astrophysicist and astronomer. He served as the 10th chancellor of the University of California, Santa Cruz from 2006 to 2019.

== Biography ==
Blumenthal was born in Milwaukee, Wisconsin, on October 20, 1945, to Lillian and Marcel Blumenthal, the owners of a small Venetian blinds operation. He was interested in science at a very early age and recalls the launch of the Soviet Sputnik I satellite in 1957. Blumenthal holds a B.S. in physics from the University of Wisconsin–Milwaukee and a Ph.D. in physics from the University of California, San Diego.

Blumenthal is known particularly for his work with Santa Cruz colleagues Sandra M. Faber and Joel Primack and with Martin Rees of Cambridge University on dark matter. Their theory of cold dark matter, developed in the 1980s, remains the standard explanation of the formation of galaxies and galaxy clusters. Blumenthal has also worked in many other areas of astrophysics, including the study of gamma-ray bursts, accretion disks, active galaxies, and the microwave background radiation left by the Big Bang.

Blumenthal was the chair of the UC Santa Cruz Academic Senate from 2001 to 2003 and served one year each as Vice Chair and Chair of the University of California Academic Senate. He succeeded Denice Denton as UCSC chancellor in 2006 after her suicide. Blumenthal stepped down as chancellor at the end of June 2019 to resume work in Astronomy and to work part time at the U.C. Berkeley Center for Studies in Higher Education. He was succeeded as chancellor by Cynthia Larive.

He co-authored of two textbooks, 21st Century Astronomy and Understanding Our Universe, and has written more than 75 scientific publications.

George Blumenthal is a member of the American University of Armenia Corporation Board of Trustees.

=== Personal life ===
Blumenthal is married to UC Hastings professor of law Kelly Weisberg, with whom he has two children.

Academic offices
| Preceded by Denice Denton | 10th Chancellor of the University of California, Santa Cruz; 2006 – 2019 | Succeeded by Cynthia Larive |
