= Susan M. Lunte =

American chemist and academic

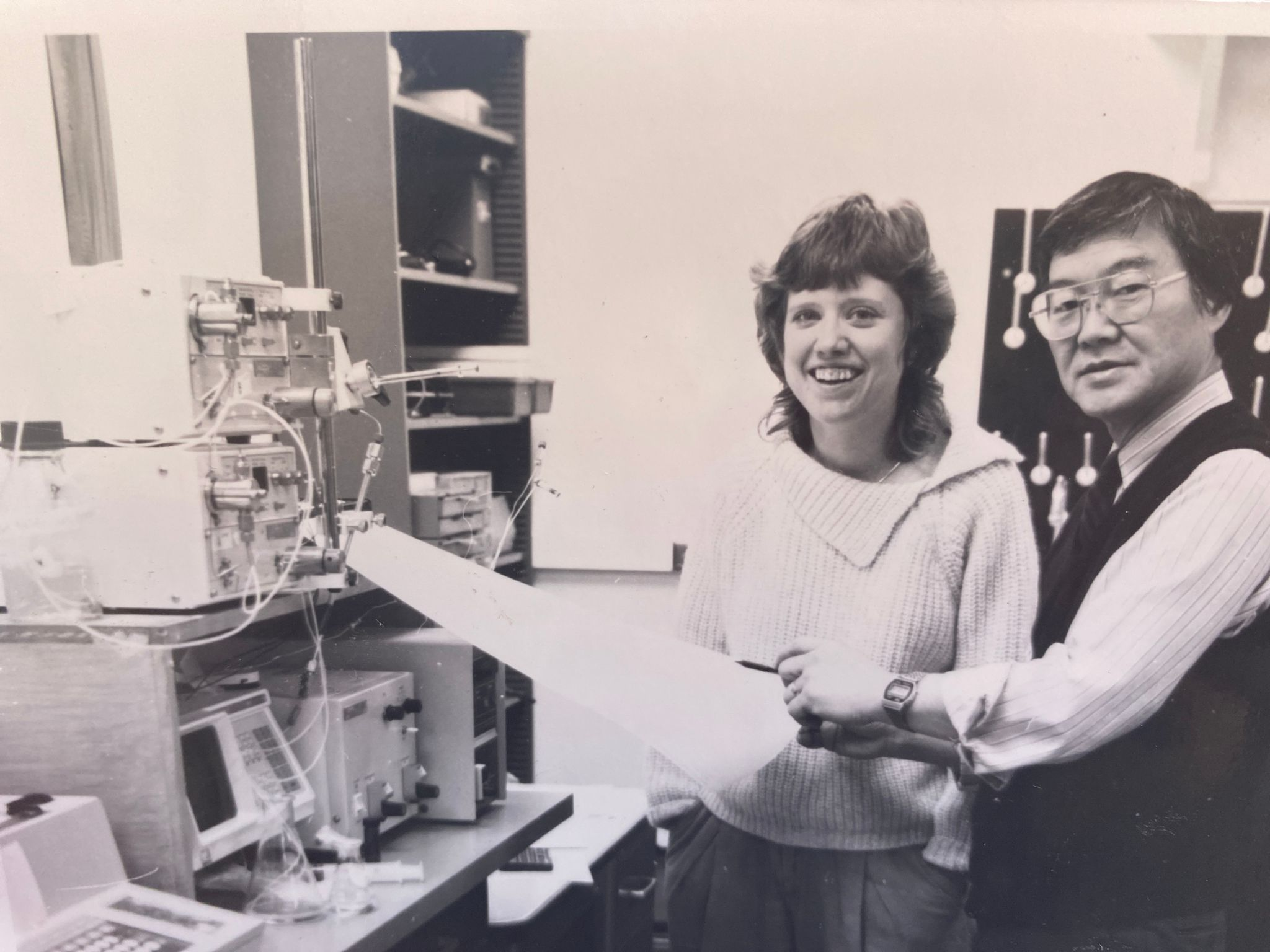
- Susan Lunte (l) with Theodore Kuwana, 1984
- Education: Purdue University; Kalamazoo College
- Scientific career
- Workplaces: University of Kansas
- Website: Sue Lunte Research Group

Susan M. Lunte is an American chemist who is the Ralph N. Adams Distinguished Professor of Chemistry and Pharmaceutical Chemistry at the University of Kansas. She also works as director of the NIH COBRE Center for Molecular Analysis of Disease Pathways. She was awarded the 2023 ACS Award in Analytical Chemistry.

== Early life and education ==
Lunte earned her undergraduate degree at Kalamazoo College. She moved to Purdue University for doctoral research, where she worked under the supervision of Peter Kissinger. Her research considers the development of microfluidics for the separation of peptides and amino acids.

== Research and career ==
Lunte develops analytical chemistry methods to study biomolecules. She is interested in understanding biological processes such as the transport of peptides across the blood-brain barrier or diagnosis of metabolic disease. In her studies of the blood brain barrier, Lunte seeks to inform the design of next-generation pharmaceuticals or better understand neurological conditions. She has developed microcolumn-based separation methods, including liquid chromatography and capillary/microchip electrophoresis, and high sensitivity detection methods: laser-induced fluorescence and electrochemical detection.

Lunte has also sought to develop separation-based sensors for monitoring pharmaceuticals in roaming animals. She has studied combined capillary electrophoresis with microdialysis to create sensors that can monitor for multiple analytes at the same time. Her group created a chip-based interface that can connect to the microdialysis sampling, microchip electrophoresis and the miniaturisation of the detector electronics, including the electrodes and the potentiostat. She has developed ultra-small cellular assays on chips which can accommodate nanoscale volumes and very fast analysis. To demonstrate this technology, Lunte has studied reactive oxygen species from macrophages and bovine brain microvessel endothelial cells. Lunte has developed disposable, microchip-based capillary electrophoresis for clinical assays being investigated. She is interested in plasma homocysteine, an analyse which is a potential indicator of heart disease.

Lunte joined the editorial board of the Royal Society of Chemistry journal Analyst in 2019.

== Awards and honors ==
- 1998 Elected to the board of directors of the Society for Electroanalytical Chemistry
- 2004 AAPS Research Achievement Award in Analysis
- 2015 The Analytical Scientist Power List 2015
- 2016 The Analytical Scientist Power List 2016
- 2017 Elected Fellow of the American Association for the Advancement of Science
- 2018 Federation of Analytical Chemistry and Spectroscopy Societies ANACHEM Award
- 2020 Elected Fellow of the American Institute for Medical and Biological Engineering
- 2021 ANYL-Roland F. Hirsch Award for Distinguished Service
- 2023 ACS Award in Analytical Chemistry

== Selected publications ==
- Martin RS; Gawron AJ; Lunte SM (1 July 2000). "Dual-electrode electrochemical detection for poly(dimethylsiloxane)-fabricated capillary electrophoresis microchips". Analytical Chemistry. 72 (14): 3196–3202. doi:10.1021/ac000160t. ISSN 0003-2700. PMID 10939387. Wikidata Q51604154.
- Walter R Vandaveer; Stephanie A Pasas-Farmer; David J Fischer; Celeste N Frankenfeld; Susan M Lunte (1 November 2004). "Recent developments in electrochemical detection for microchip capillary electrophoresis". Electrophoresis. 25 (21–22): 3528–3549. doi:10.1002/elps.200406115. ISSN 0173-0835. PMID 15565707. Wikidata Q35964298.
- Lacher NA; Garrison KE; Martin RS; Lunte SM (1 August 2001). "Microchip capillary electrophoresis/electrochemistry". Electrophoresis. 22 (12): 2526–2536. doi:10.1002/1522-2683(200107)22:12<2526::aid-elps2526>3.0.co;2-k. ISSN 0173-0835. PMID 11519957. Wikidata Q34344737.
