= Raman spectroelectrochemistry =

Raman spectroelectrochemistry (Raman-SEC) is a technique that studies the inelastic scattering or Raman scattering of monochromatic light related to chemical compounds involved in an electrode process. This technique provides information about vibrational energy transitions of molecules, using a monochromatic light source, usually from a laser that belongs to the UV, Vis or NIR region. Raman spectroelectrochemistry provides specific information about structural changes, composition and orientation of the molecules on the electrode surface involved in an electrochemical reaction, being the Raman spectra registered a real fingerprint of the compounds.

When a monochromatic light beam samples the electrode/solution interface, most of the photons are scattered elastically, with the same energy than the incident light. However, a small fraction is scattered inelastically, being the energy of the laser photons shifted up or down. When the scattering is elastic, the phenomenon is denoted as Rayleigh scattering, while when it is inelastic it is called Raman scattering. Raman spectroscopy combined with electrochemical techniques, makes Raman spectroelectrochemistry a powerful technique in the identification, characterization and quantification of molecules.

The main advantage of Raman spectroelectrochemistry is that it is not limited to the selected solvent, and aqueous and organic solutions can be used. However, the main disadvantage is the intrinsic low Raman signal intensity. Different methods as well as new substrates were developed to improve the sensitivity and selectivity of this multirresponse technique.

For researchers, a few experimental considerations related to Raman spectroelectrochemistry include electrode preparation, cell design, laser parameters, electrochemical sequence and data process.

== Methods ==
- RRS effect (Resonance Raman Scaterring)

The Raman resonance effect produces an increase in Raman intensity up to 10^{6} times. In this phenomenon, the monochromatic light interaction with the sample produces the transition of the molecules from the fundamental state to an excited electronic state, instead of a virtual state as in normal Raman spectroscopy. This phenomenon of increased intensity could be observed in materials such as carbon nanotubes.

- SERS (Surface-Enhanced Raman Scattering)

Surface-Enhanced Raman Scattering (SERS) is a technique capable of increasing Raman signal intensity up to 10^{11} times. This phenomenon is based on the interaction of monochromatic light with materials that exhibit plasmonic properties. The most common metals used in SERS are nanostructured metals with plasmonic band (gold, silver or copper). Nanostructured electrode surfaces can be generated by depositing metallic nanostructures of these materials. A disadvantage of this phenomenon is, sometimes, the lack of reproducibility of the spectra due to the difficulty of obtaining identical nanostructured surfaces in each experiment.

- SOERS (Surface-Oxidation-Enhanced Raman Scattering)

Surface-oxidation enhanced Raman scattering (SOERS) is a process similar to SERS, which allows the Raman signal to be enhanced when a silver electrode is oxidized in a particular electrolyte composition. This process is carried out at sufficiently positive potentials to ensure the oxidation of the electrode surface. There are significant differences with the SERS effect, but it is a phenomenon that also enhances the Raman signal.

- SHINERS (Shell-Isolated Nanoparticle-Enhanced Raman Spectroscopy)

In SHINERS, metallic nanoparticles with plasmonic properties are coated with ultra-thin homogeneous silica or alumina layers, forming isolated nanoparticles. The metallic nucleus (Au or Ag) is responsible of the enhancement of the Raman signals of the nearby molecules, while the coating layers eliminate the influence of the metallic nucleus on the Raman and electrochemical signals by preventing the molecules from being directly adsorbed onto them. Silica and alumina coating can improve the chemical and thermal stability of nanoparticles. This fact has great importance in the in-situ study of catalytic reactions. The high sensitivity of the SHINERS surfaces makes these nanostructures a promising tool for the study of liquid-solid interfaces, especially in spectroelectrochemistry.

- TERS (Tip-Enhanced Raman Scattering)

Tip-enhanced Raman scattering (TERS) is a technique that provides molecular information at nanoscale. In these experiments, metal nanostructures are replaced by a sharp metal tip of nanometric size, concentrating the roughness directly on a small region that improves the spatial resolution of scanning techniques in Raman spectroscopy.

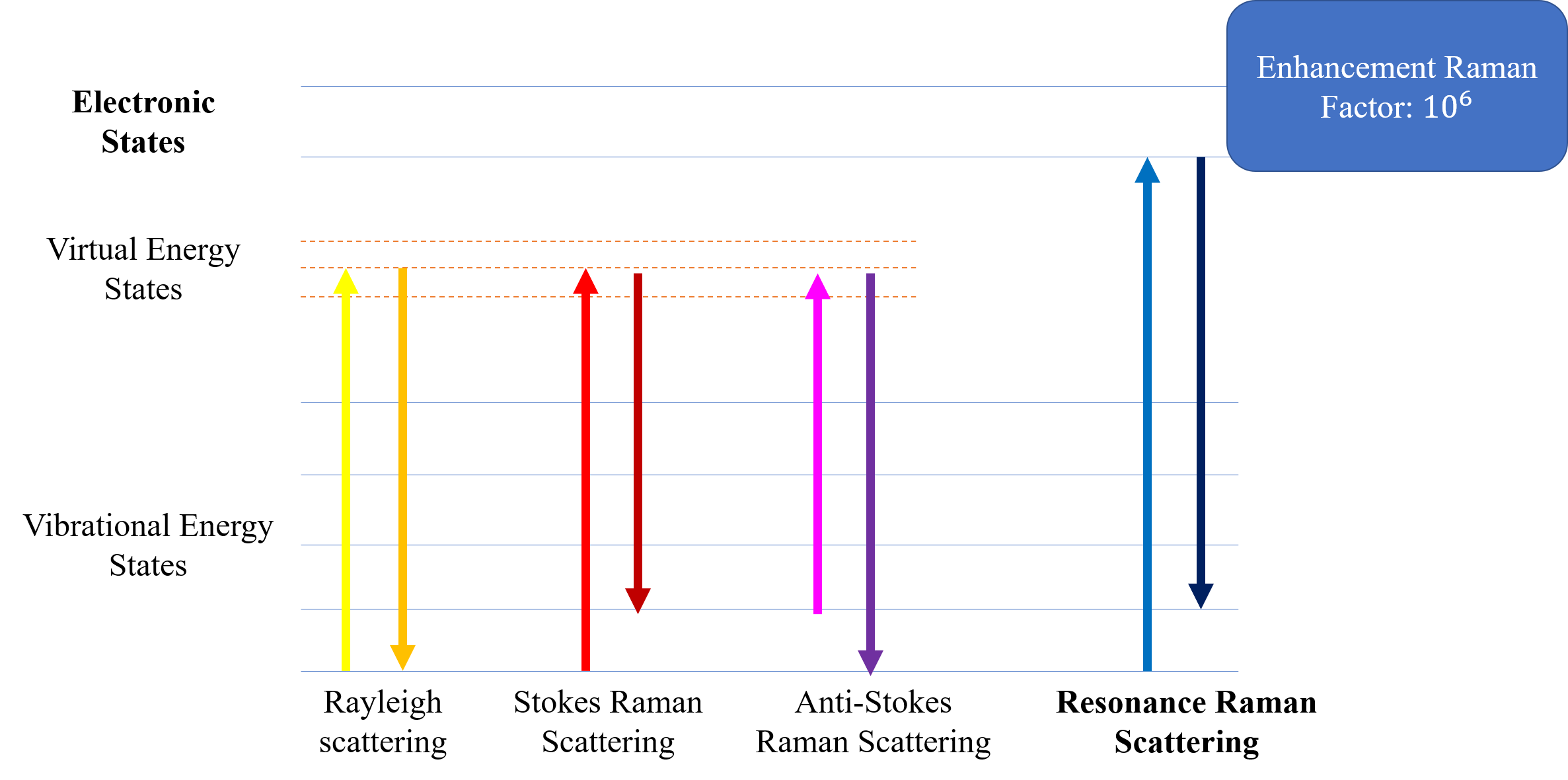
Diagram of the different energy levels showing the states involved in the Raman signal

== Configuration ==
Different configurations can be used to perform Raman-SEC experiments. Raman scattering provides spectra with very weak Raman bands, therefore, a very well aligned optical configuration is required. Laser has to be focused on the electrode surface and an efficient collection of the scattered photons is mandatory. Many of the instruments used for Raman-SEC are based on the combination of a spectrometer, a potentiostat and a confocal microscope, since it is possible to focus and collect the scattered photons in a highly efficient way. Low resolution Raman spectrometers can be also used, providing suitable results. Using this setup, the sampling area is larger and average information about the electrode surface is obtained.

Typical configurations in Raman-SEC:

- Normal configuration. The laser beam samples the electrode/solution interface in a normal way respect to the electrode surface. The scattered radiation is collected, and the monochromator allows passing only the light beam with wavelengths different from that of the laser used.
- Inverted microscope. In this configuration the electrode/solution is sampled from behind the electrode, using optically transparent electrodes (OTE).
- Angular configuration. This configuration is usually selected when electrochemical techniques are combined with TERS.

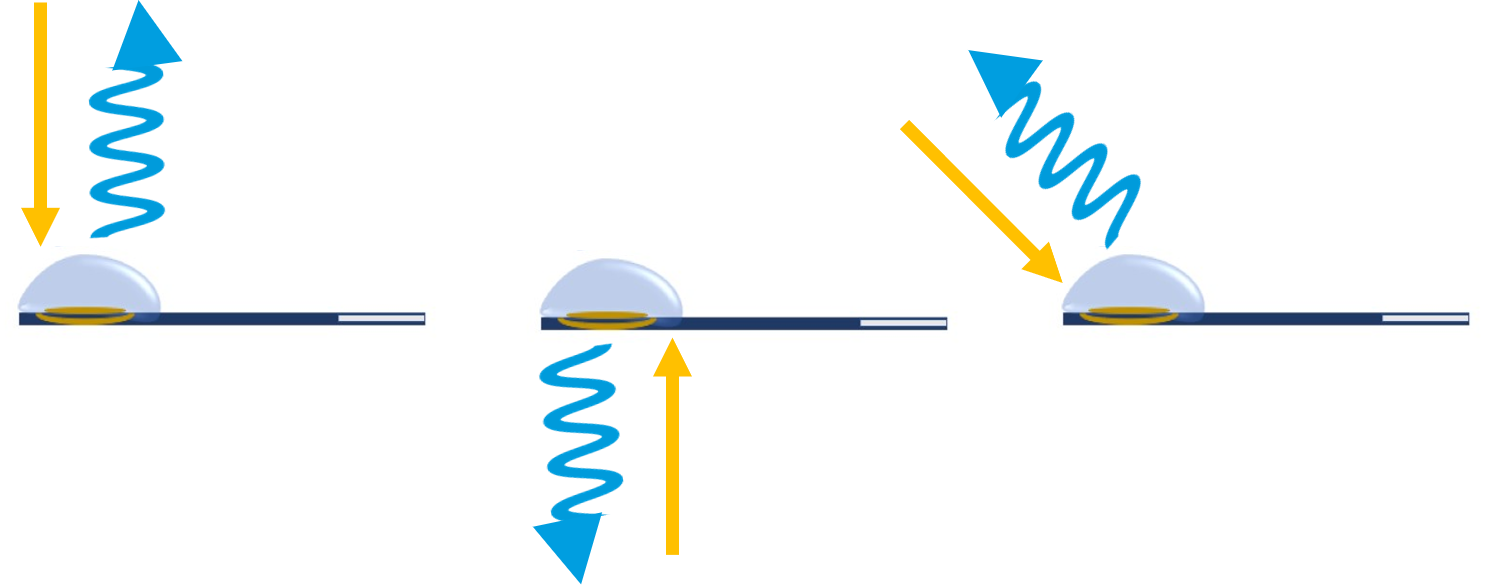
Raman-SEC configurations. The first picture shows the normal arrangement, the second the inverted microscope configuration and the last the angle arrangement. All of them are shown on screen-printed electrodes.

== Instrumentation ==
The experimental setup to perform Raman spectroelectrochemistry consists of a light source, a spectrometer, a potentiostat, a spectroelectrochemical cell, a three-electrode system, radiation beam conducting devices, data collection and analysis devices. Nowadays, there are commercial instruments that integrate all these elements in a single instrument, significantly simplifying the performance of spectroelectrochemical experiments.

- Light source. It provides the monochromatic electromagnetic radiation that interacts with the sample during the electrochemical process. In Raman-SEC, the light source is usually a laser corresponding to the VIS or NIR regions, which commonly emits at 532, 633, 785 or 1064 nm, although there is the possibility of using many other lasers, including UV-lasers.
- Spectrometer. It records the scattered radiation and provides the Raman spectra of the molecules. In Raman-SEC, spectrometers are usually combined with confocal microscopes (micro-Raman) to remove the information out of the focus, obtaining an excellent spectral resolution. However, it is possible to work with low resolution Raman spectrometers obtaining very good results.
- Potentiostat/Galvanostat. It is the electronic device that allows controlling the potential of the working electrode respect to the reference electrode, or controlling the current that passes respect to the auxiliary electrode.
- Three-electrode system. It contains a working electrode, a reference electrode and an auxiliary electrode. This system can be simplified by using screen-printed electrodes that include all three electrodes in a single holder.
- Spectroelectrochemical cell (SEC cell). It is the device that includes the three-electrode system and allows the simultaneous recording of the Raman spectra of the species and the electrochemical signal. It is the link between optical and electrochemical techniques.
- Devices for conducting the radiation beam: lenses, mirrors and/or optical fibres. The last ones conduct the electromagnetic radiation over long distances with hardly any losses. In addition, they simplify the optical configurations since they allow working with a small amount of solution; in this way, it is easier to conduct and collect the light in the nearness of the electrode.
- Data collection and analysis devices. It consists of a computer to collect simultaneously the signals provided by the spectrometer and the electrochemical instrument. Using an appropriate software, the generated signals can be acquired, transformed, analyzed and interpreted.

== Applications ==
In recent years Raman-SEC has become an important tool in the study of electrochemical processes and in the characterization of many molecules, providing specific in situ information about them. Some applications are:

- Materials: Raman-SEC is widely used in the study and characterization of new materials, such as graphene, carbon nanotubes or conductive polymers, among others. It is also applied in the study of dyes, organic molecules capable of forming monolayers on the electrode, and in the study of proteins.
- Qualitative and quantitative analysis: Raman-SEC can be applied to highly complex samples, such as the detection of melamine in milk, the identification of bacteria, the detection of DNA biomarkers and/or uric acid in urine, among others. In addition, very low concentrations can be detected.
- Energy. Raman-SEC were used in the study of solar cells, batteries and catalysts for fuel cells.
- Transfer processes at the liquid/liquid interfaces: Raman-SEC is used to monitor ion or electron transfer processes at polarizable interfaces between immiscible electrolyte solutions.
