= Environmental analysis =

Environmental analysis is the use of examination and statistical methods to study the chemical and biological factors that determine the quality of an environment. The purpose of this is commonly to monitor and study levels of pollutants in the atmosphere, rivers and other specific settings. Also, to monitor amounts of natural and chemical components. Other environmental analysis techniques include biological surveys or biosurveys, soil analysis or soil tests, vegetation surveys, tree identification, and remote sensing which uses satellite imagery to assess the environment on different spatial scales.

== Analysis techniques ==
Chemical analysis typically involves sampling some part of the environment and using analytical equipment to figure out how much of a certain target compound exists. Chemical analysis may be used to assess pollution levels for remediation, or to make sure groundwater is safe for drinking.

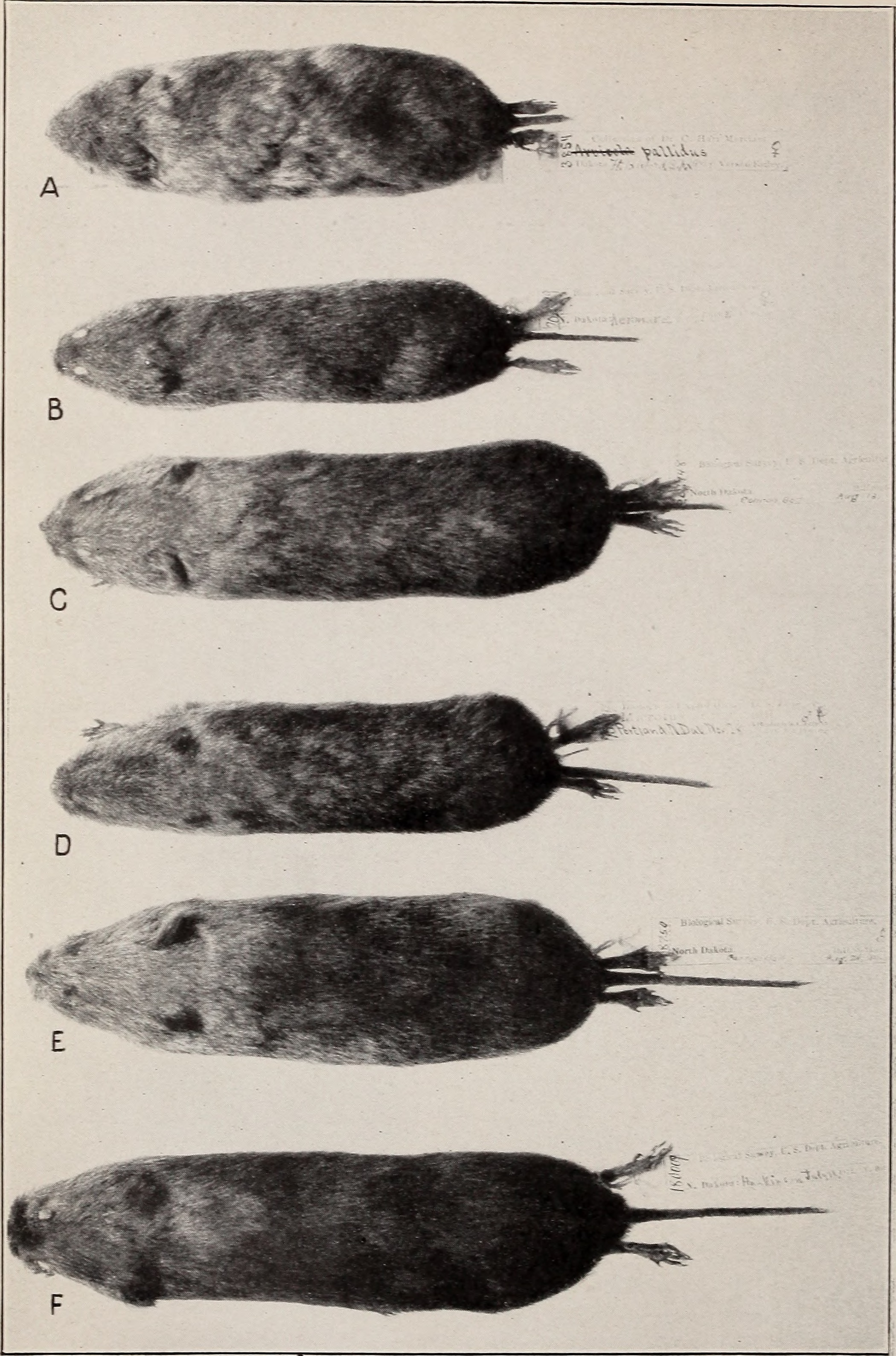
Biological survey example (different species)

Biological surveys typically includes a measurement of the abundance of a certain species within a certain area to confirm information about the ecosystem for specific reasons. Analysis like this could be used in efforts to understand species abundance, or to look at how external effects from the environment are affecting an ecosystem.

Soil tests may involve chemical analysis, but most often soil tests involve removing a section of soil to understand what each layer of soil is composed of for specific reasons. Soil samples might be needed when determining whether they can build on a certain site, or just to produce a model of an area, or to determine possible crop production considering nutrient levels.

Vegetation surveys are quite similar to a biosurvey, it'is the process of measuring the abundance of plant species and trees within a specific area to understand more about the ecosystem for specific reasons. Sometimes these are done to understand ecological effects from outside factors, or to just determine overall ecosystem health.

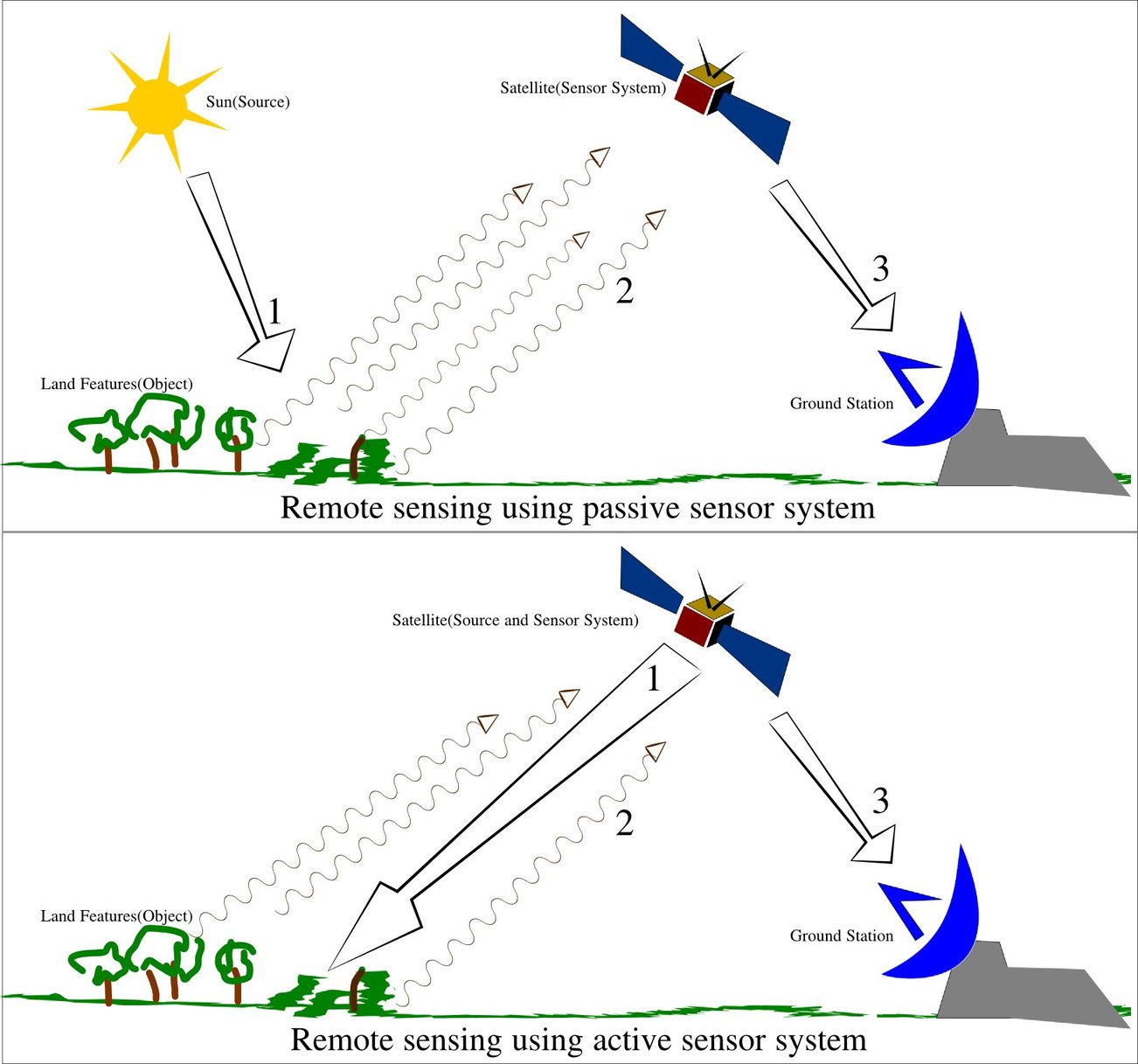
Remote sensing illustration

Remote sensing can be used for environmental analysis by taking imagery shot by satellites in multiple wavelengths to assess areas of different scales for a certain objective. Remote sensing can be used to identify land use, it can be used to determine damages from forest fires, it can be used for weather systems and meteorology, and also for atmospheric composition. Recent advances in the remote sensing field has also led to the development of autonomous devices for the analysis of physical and chemical parameters of the environment using the sensors.
