= UV-Vis absorption spectroelectrochemistry =

Ultraviolet-visible (UV-Vis) absorption spectroelectrochemistry (SEC) is a multiresponse technique that analyzes the evolution of the absorption spectra in UV-Vis regions during an electrode process. This technique provides information from an electrochemical and spectroscopic point of view. In this way, it enables a better perception about the chemical system of interest. On one hand, molecular information related to the electronic levels of the molecules is obtained from the evolution of the spectra. On the other hand, kinetic and thermodynamic information of the processes is obtained from the electrochemical signal.

UV-Vis absorption SEC allows qualitative analysis, through the characterization of the different present compounds, and quantitative analysis, by determining the concentration of the analytes of interest. Furthermore, it helps to determine different electrochemical parameters such as absorptivity coefficients, standard potentials, diffusion coefficients, electronic transfer rate constants, etc. Throughout history, reversible processes have been studied with colored reagents or electrolysis products. Nowadays, it is possible to study all kinds of electrochemical processes in the entire UV-Vis spectral range, even in the near infrared (NIR).

== Configuration ==
In UV-Vis absorption SEC, depending on the configuration of the light beam respect to the electrode/solution interface, two types of optical arrangements can be distinguished: normal and parallel configuration.

=== Normal configuration ===
In normal configuration, the light beam samples perpendicularly the electrode surface. Normal configuration provides optical information related to the changes that take place in the solution adjacent to the electrode and on the electrode surface. The optical path length coincides with the diffusion layer thickness, which is usually in the order of micrometers. This arrangement is the most suitable when the compound of interest is deposited or adsorbed on the working electrode, because it provides information about all processes occurring on the electrode surface.

UV-Vis absorption SEC in normal arrangement can be performed using both transmission and reflection phenomena.

- Normal transmission

In normal transmission, the light beam passes through a optically transparent working electrode, collecting information about the phenomena that take place on the surface of the electrode and on the solution adjacent to it. Electrodes in this configuration must be composed of materials that have great electrical conductivity and adequate optical transparency in the spectral region of interest.

The external reflection mode was proposed to improve the sensitivity and to use non-transparent electrodes.

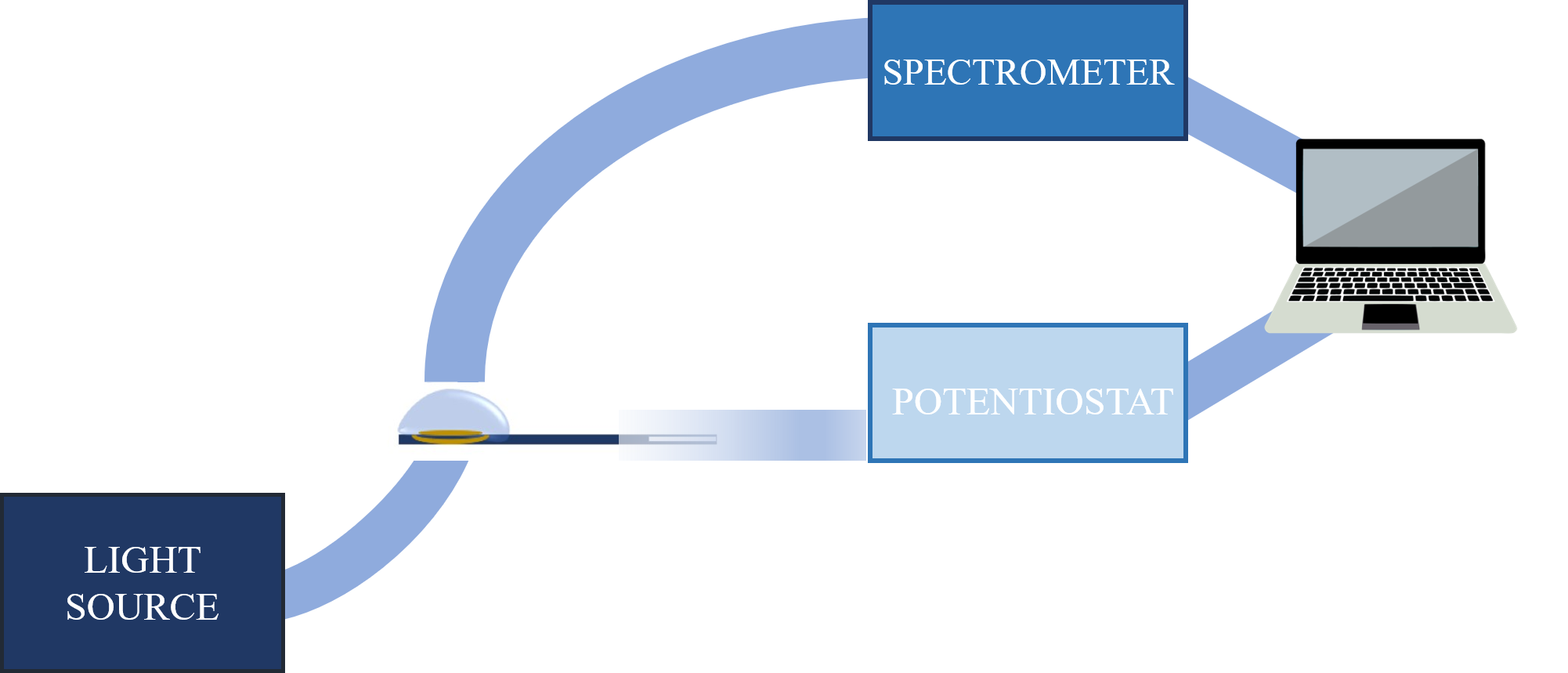
Normal transmission scheme

- Normal reflection

In normal reflection, the light beam travels in a perpendicular direction to the working electrode surface on which the reflection occurs. The reflected beam is collected to be analyzed in the spectrometer. It is also possible to work with other incidence and collection angles. This configuration is an alternative when the working electrode is non-transparent. In this configuration, the optical path-length in solution is on the order of twice the diffusion layer thickness. It should be noticed that growth of films on the electrode surface could cause optical interference phenomena. As it is based on reflection phenomenon, in many cases reflectance is used as unit of measurement instead of absorbance.

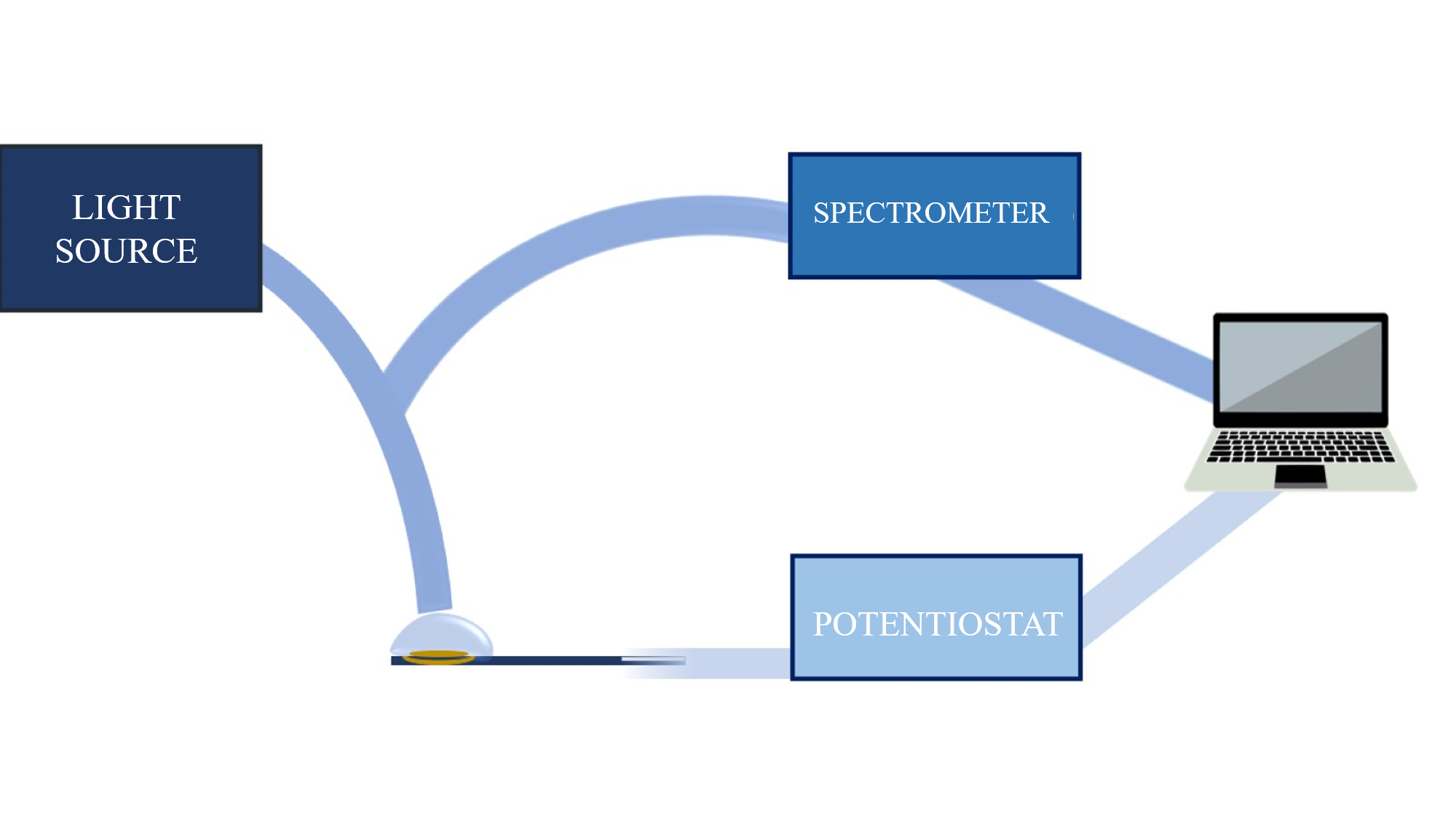
Normal reflection scheme

=== Parallel or long optical path-length configuration ===
The parallel configuration or long optical path-length arrangement only provides information about the spectral changes that occur in the solution adjacent to the working electrode surface, improving the sensitivity to soluble compounds because the length of the optical pathway can be as longer as the length of the electrode.

The light beam travels parallel to the working electrode surface, sampling the first micrometers of the solution adjacent to the working electrode surface, and collecting the information on the spectrometer.

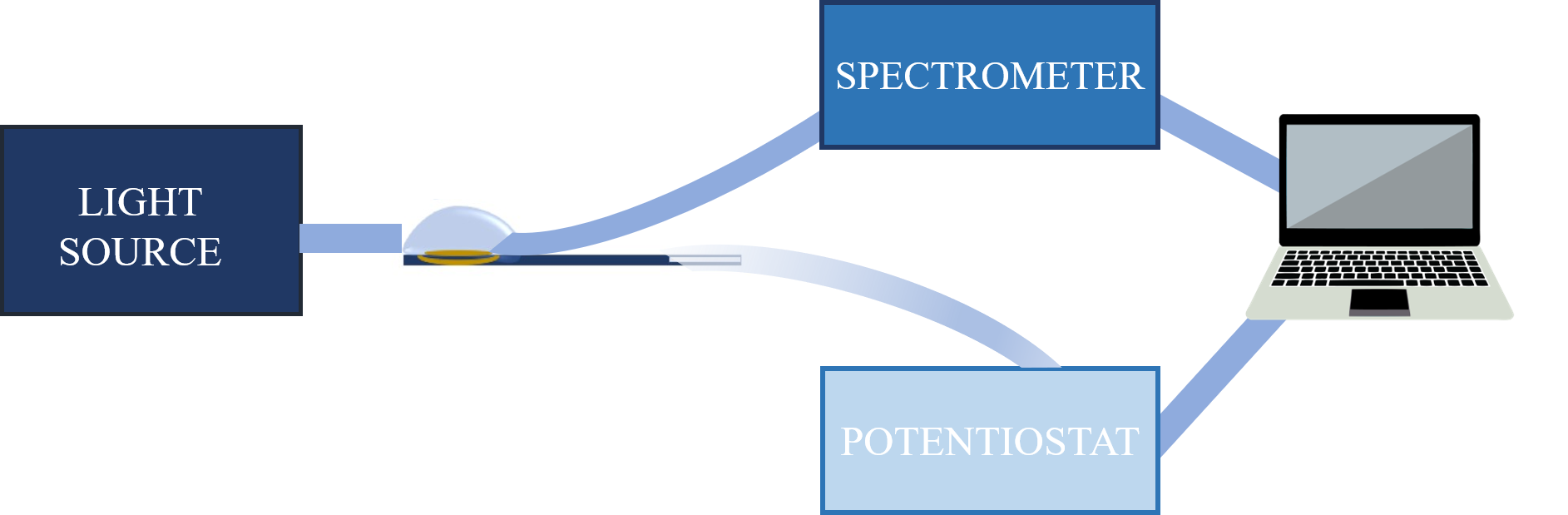
Parallel configuration scheme

Usually, aligning light beams has been a difficult task. However, simple alternatives have been developed to perform measurements in parallel configuration. There are several advantages in this configuration respect to the normal one: better sensitivity, lower detection limits; optically transparent electrodes are not required; and the spectral changes are related only to the diffusion layer.

== Instrumentation ==
The experimental set-up used to carry out UV-Vis absorption SEC measurements depends on the chosen configuration and the characteristics of the analyte. The experimental set-up is composed of a light source, a spectrometer, a potentiostat/galvanostat, a SEC cell, a three-electrode system, optical elements to conduct the light beam, and a computer for data collection and analysis. Currently, there are commercial devices that integrate all these elements in a single instrument, simplifying significantly the SEC experiments.

- Light source: provides the electromagnetic radiation that interacts with the sample while the electrochemical process is taking place. A specific source is required for the UV-Vis spectral region, being the most common the deuterium/halogen lamp.
- Spectrometer: instrument that allows measuring the properties of the light in a certain region of the electromagnetic spectrum. It uses a monochromator to separate the different spectral wavelengths of interest emitted by the light source. A diode-array detector can be used to obtain time-resolved spectra. For UV-Vis spectroelectrochemistry, spectrometer must be specific for UV-Vis spectral region.
- Potentiostat/Galvanostat: electronic device that allows controlling the working electrode potential regarding to the reference electrode or controlling the current that passes respect to the auxiliary electrode.
- Three electrode system: consists of a working electrode, a reference electrode and an auxiliary electrode. This system can be simplified by using screen-printed electrodes that include the three electrodes on a single holder.
- Spectroelectrochemical cell: device in which the solution and the system of three electrodes is located, avoiding possible interference in the optical path. It is the link between the electrochemistry and the UV-Vis absorption spectroscopy.
- Devices to conduct the radiation beam: lenses, mirrors and/or optical fibers. The last ones conduct electromagnetic radiation over great distances with hardly any losses. In addition, they simplify the optical configurations because they allow working with a small amount of solution. Optical fibers make easier to conduct and collect light near the electrode.
- Analysis and data collection devices: a computer collects the signals provided by the spectrometer and potentiostat that, using a suitable software, treats, analyzes and interprets the signals.

== Applications ==
UV-Vis absorption SEC is a recent technique that is continuously evolving. However, many advantages have been observed over other techniques. The most outstanding advantages are:

- It generates a large amount of information about the systems.
- Generally, solvents are not a problem when carrying out these kinds of measurements.
- The wavelength selection generates specificity in the measurement of each species.
- Currently, there are commercial devices that allow carrying out a large number of experiments with high reproducibility.
- The kinetics of the reactions can be studied.
- It is used to determine a large number of electrochemical and optical parameters.
- Trilinear signals are obtained.
- Small amounts of sample can be analyzed.
- Faradaic current can be separated from non-faradaic current in an electrode process.
- It is more specific than electrochemistry.
- Quantitative information can be obtained.

UV-Vis absorption SEC has been used mainly in different research fields such as:

- Sensor development.
- Reaction mechanisms.
- Diffusion and adsorption processes.
- Characterization of compounds.
- Study of biological interest substances.
- Study of optical and electrical materials properties.
- Study of liquid/liquid interfaces.
- Study and synthesis of nanomaterials.
- Evaluation of reaction parameters in which electron transfer occurs.
