= Spectroelectrochemistry =

Set Of multi-response ANALYTICAL techniques

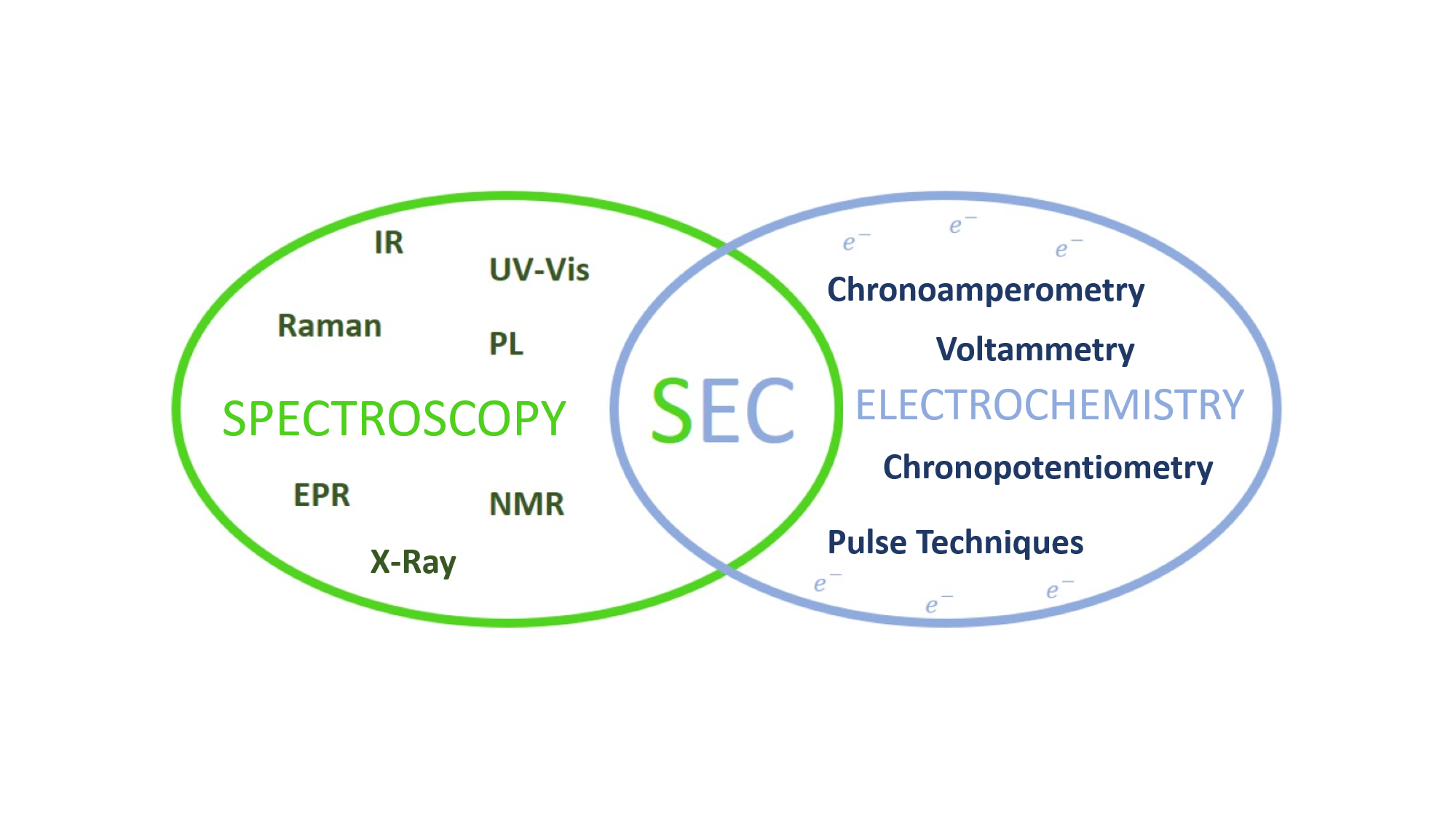
Spectroscopic and electrochemical techniques that form the spectroelectrochemistry

Spectroelectrochemistry (SEC) is a set of multi-response analytical techniques in which complementary chemical information (electrochemical and spectroscopic) is obtained in a single experiment. Spectroelectrochemistry provides a whole vision of the phenomena that take place in the electrode process. The first spectroelectrochemical experiment was carried out by Theodore Kuwana, PhD, in 1964.

The main objective of spectroelectrochemical experiments is to obtain simultaneous, time-resolved and in-situ electrochemical and spectroscopic information on reactions taking place on the electrode surface. The base of the technique consist in studying the interaction of a beam of electromagnetic radiation with the compounds involved in these reactions. The changes of the optical and electrical signal allow us to understand the evolution of the electrode process.

The techniques on which the spectroelectrochemistry is based are:

- Electrochemistry, which studies the interaction between electrical energy and chemical changes. This technique allows us to analyse reactions that involve electron transfer processes (redox reactions).
- Spectroscopy, which studies the interaction between electromagnetic radiation and matter (absorption, dispersion or emission).

Spectroelectrochemistry provides molecular, thermodynamic and kinetic information of reagents, products and/or intermediates involved in the electron transfer process. A subfield of spectroelectrochemistry is nanospectroelectrochemistry (NSEC).

== Classification of spectroelectrochemical techniques ==
There are different spectroelectrochemical techniques based on the combination of spectroscopic and electrochemical techniques. Regarding electrochemistry, the most common techniques used are:

- Chronoamperometry, which measures current intensity as a function of time by applying a constant difference of potential to the working electrode.
- Chronopotentiometry, which measures the difference of potential as a function of time by applying a constant current.
- Voltammetry, which measures the change of current as a function of the linear change of the working electrode potential.
- Pulse techniques, which measure the change of current as a function of difference of potential, applying pulse potential functions to the working electrode.

The general classification of the spectroelectrochemical techniques is based on the spectroscopic technique chosen.

=== Ultraviolet-visible absorption spectroelectrochemistry ===
Ultraviolet-visible(UV-Vis) absorption spectroelectrochemistry is a technique that studies the absorption of electromagnetic radiation in the UV-Vis regions of the spectrum, providing molecular information related to the electronic levels of molecules. It provides qualitative as well as quantitative information. UV-Vis spectroelectrochemistry helps to characterize compounds and materials, determines concentrations and different parameters such as absorptivity coefficients, diffusion coefficients, formal potentials or electron transfer rates.

=== Photoluminescence spectroelectrochemistry ===
Photoluminescence (PL) is a phenomenon related to the ability of some compounds that, after absorbing specific electromagnetic radiation, relax to a lower energy state through emission of photons. This spectroelectrochemical technique is limited to those compounds with fluorescent or luminescent properties. The experiments are strongly interfered by ambient light. This technique provides structural information and quantitative information with great detection limits.

=== Infrared spectroelectrochemistry ===
Infrared spectroscopy is based on the fact that molecules absorb electromagnetic radiation at characteristic frequencies related to their vibrational structure. Infrared (IR) spectroelectrochemistry is a technique that allows the characterization of molecules based on the resistance, stiffness and number of bonds present. It also detects the presence of compounds, determines the concentration of species during a reaction, the structure of compounds, the properties of the chemical bonds, etc.

=== Raman spectroelectrochemistry ===
Raman spectroelectrochemistry is based on the inelastic scattering or Raman scattering of monochromatic light when it strikes upon a specific molecule, providing information about vibrational energy of that molecule. Raman spectrum provides highly specific information about the structure and composition of the molecules, such as a true fingerprint of them. It has been extensively used to study single wall carbon nanotubes and graphene.

=== X-ray spectroelectrochemistry ===
X-ray spectroelectrochemistry is a technique that studies the interaction of high-energy radiation with matter during an electrode process. X-rays can originate absorption, emission or scattering phenomena, allowing to perform both quantitative and qualitative analysis depending on the phenomenon taking place. All these processes involve electronic transitions in the inner layers of the atoms involved. Particularly, it is interesting to study the processes of radiation, absorption and emission that take place during an electron transfer reaction. In these processes, the promotion or relaxation of an electron can occur between an outer shell and an inner shell of the atom.

=== Nuclear magnetic resonance spectroelectrochemistry ===
Nuclear magnetic resonance (NMR) is a technique used to obtain physical, chemical, electronic and structural information about molecules due to the chemical shift of the resonance frequencies of nuclear spins in the sample. Its combination with electrochemical techniques can provide detailed and quantitative information about the functional groups, topology, dynamics and the three-dimensional structure of molecules in solution during a charge transfer process. The area under an NMR peak is related to the ratio of the number of turns involved and the peak integrals to determine the composition quantitatively.

=== Electron paramagnetic resonance spectroelectrochemistry ===
Electron paramagnetic resonance (EPR) is a technique that allows the detection of free radicals formed in chemical or biological systems. In addition, it studies the symmetry and electronic distribution of paramagnetic ions. This is a highly specific technique because the magnetic parameters are characteristic of each ion or free radical. The physical principles of this technique are analogous to those of NMR, but in the case of EPR, electronic spins are excited instead of nuclear, that is interesting in certain electrode reactions.

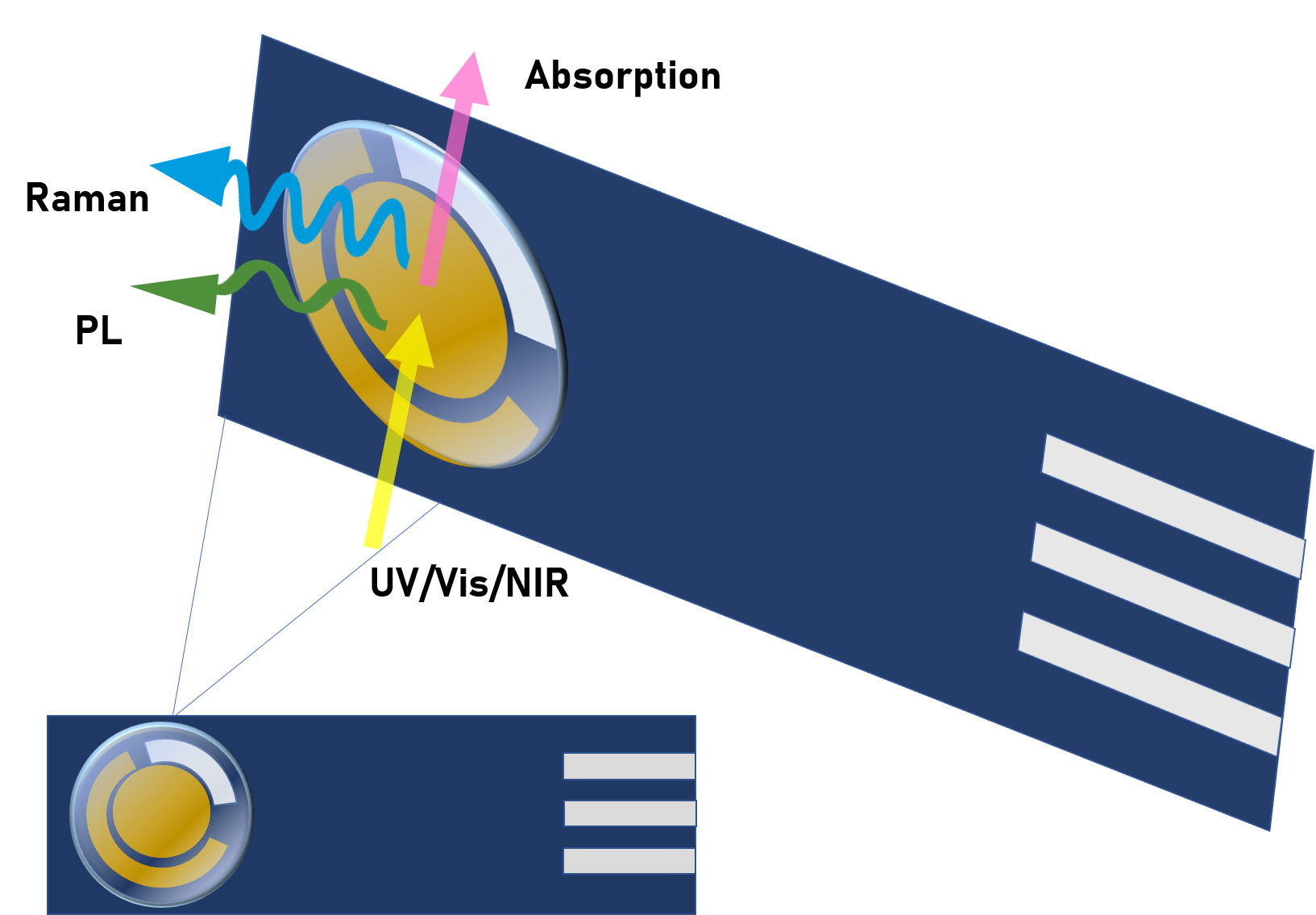
Screen-printed electrode with some of the different types of SEC measurements (absorption, emission, Raman scattering). The figure shows a system of three electrodes: the central disc, corresponding to the working electrode; the semicircle with the largest arc, corresponding to the auxiliary or counter electrode; and the semicircle with the smallest arc, the reference electrode.

== Advantages and applications ==
The versatility of spectroelectrochemistry is increasing due to the possibility of using several electrochemical techniques in different spectral regions depending on the purpose of the study and the information of interest.

The main advantages of spectroelectrochemical techniques are:

- The simultaneous information is obtained by different techniques in a single experiment, increasing the selectivity and the sensitivity.
- Both qualitative and quantitative information can be obtained.
- The possibility of working with a small amount of sample, saving it for future analysis.

Due to the high versatility of the technique, the field of applications is considerably wide.

- Study of reaction mechanisms, where the oxidation and reduction of the species involved in the reaction can be observed, as well as the generation of reaction intermediates.
- Characterization of organic and inorganic materials, that allow to understand the structure and properties of the material when is perturbed by a signal (electric, light, etc.).
- Development of spectroelectrochemical sensors, which are based on optical and electrical responses, capable of providing two independent signals about the same sample and offering a self-validated determination.
- Study of catalysts, obtaining relationships between the electrochemical and spectroscopic properties and their photochemical and photophysical behaviour.
- Study different processes and molecules in biotechnology, biochemistry or medicine.
- Determine specific properties and characteristics of new materials in fields such as energy or nanotechnology.
