= Analytical Sciences Digital Library =

Digital library in the National Science Digital Library

The Analytical Sciences Digital Library (ASDL) was founded in 2001 as one of several digital libraries in the National Science Digital Library, funded by the National Science Foundation. The library is a collection of peer-reviewed electronic resources on chemical measurements and instrumentation. The collection also contains materials on active learning and its use for effective instruction in the analytical sciences. The resources in ASDL are freely available and widely used by students, teachers and practitioners of analytical chemistry and its application areas. The site includes a collection of annotated electronic resources catalogued with the Open Archive Initiative and Dublin Core Metadata Initiative, making the collection searchable by any other group that uses these definitions.

Since 2004, the Journal of the Analytical Sciences Digital Library, JASDL, has published peer-reviewed online articles in the categories of courseware, labware, educational practices, undergraduate research, and poster sessions. The site is an open source site, and therefore publication is under the Creative Commons license. As a result, authors retain copyright privileges and are free to publish their work elsewhere. This allows for a wider variety of published works to be available freely to the scientific community.

The ASDL community of users can participate in activities that promote analytical chemistry and help advance the education and training of future members of the analytical chemistry community by submitting and viewing posters for the ASDL online poster session, posting your information in the Analytical Sciences Professional Directory, contributing a url for consideration for the web collection, writing a JASDL article on an innovative aspect of your teaching or research with undergraduates or by volunteering to review new ASDL materials.

In 2007 ASDL partnered with the Analytical Division of the American Chemical Society to broaden their ability to serve as a connection place online for the analytical sciences community.
