= Screen-printed electrodes =

Printed measurement device

Screen-printed electrodes (SPEs) are electrochemical measurement devices that are manufactured by printing different types of ink on plastic or ceramic substrates, allowing quick in-situ analysis with high reproducibility, sensitivity and accuracy. The composition of the different inks (carbon, silver, gold, platinum) used in the manufacture of the electrode determines its selectivity and sensitivity. This fact allows the analyst to design the most optimal device according to its purpose.

The evolution of these electrochemical cells arises from the need to reduce the size of the devices, that implies a decrease of the sample volume required in each experiment. In addition, the development of SPEs has enable the reduction of the production costs.

One of the principal advantages is the possibility of modifying the screen-printed electrodes, modifying the composition of its inks by adding different metals, enzymes, complexing agents, polymers, etc., which is useful for the preparation of multitude electrochemical analyses.

== Description ==
Screen printing is one of the oldest methods of reproduction. The screen-printed electrodes (SPEs) are presented as a single device in which there are three different electrodes:

- Working electrode. Their response is sensitive to the analyte concentration.
- Reference electrode. It allows the application of a known potential, which is independent of the analyte and other ions concentration. Its potential is constant, and the working electrode potential is measured against it.
- Auxiliary or counter electrode. It is the electrode that completes the circuit of the three-electrode cell, as it allows the passage of current. It enables the analysis of processes in which electronic transfer takes place.

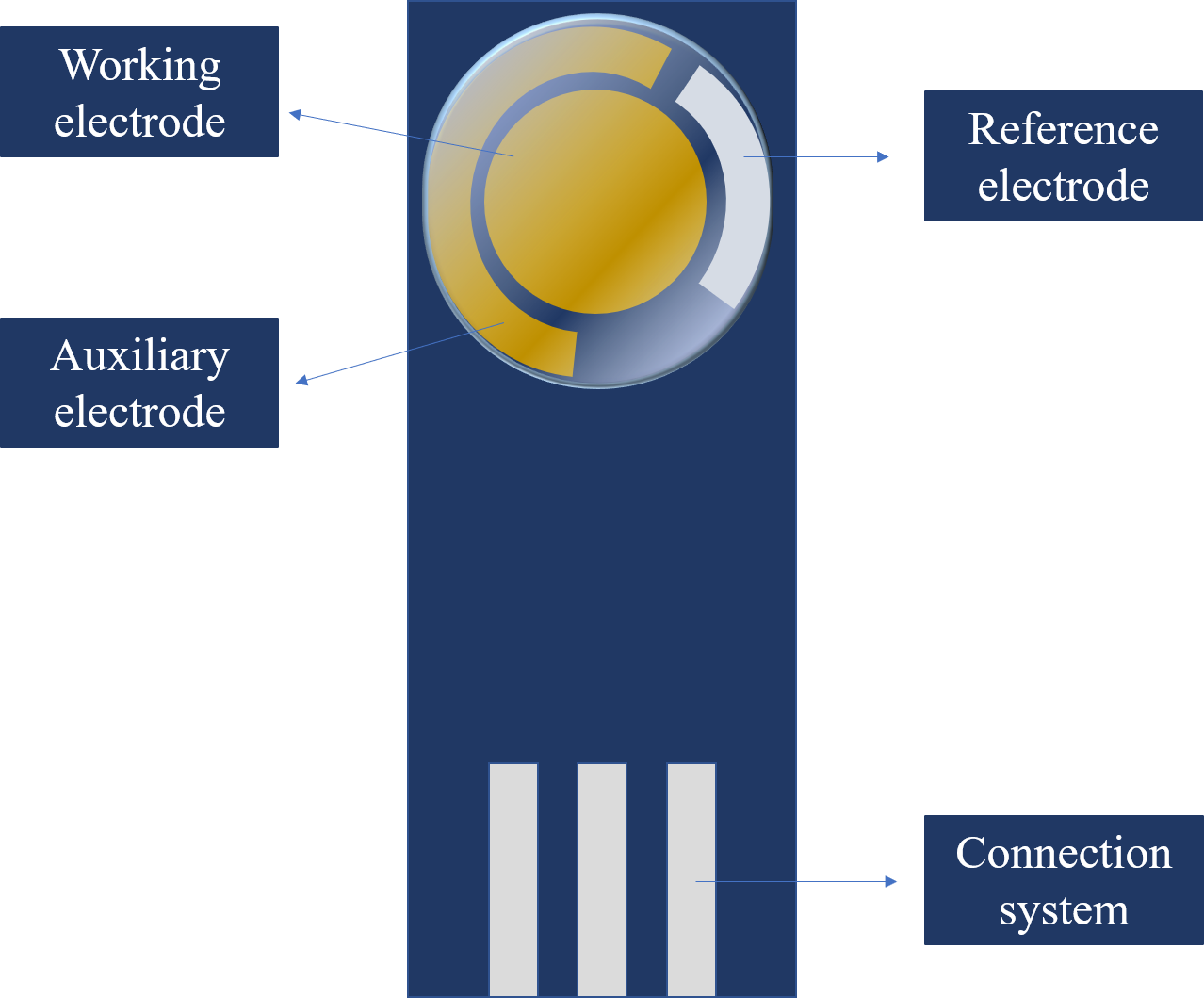
Screen-printed electrode with the three electrode system, reference electrode (RE), working electrode (WE) and auxiliary or counter electrode (AE or CE)

The three electrodes could be printed on different types of substrates (plastic or ceramic) and could be manufactured with a great variety of inks. The most common inks are those composed of silver and carbon, however, they can be based on other metals such as platinum, gold, palladium or copper. In addition, the electrodes can be modified with enzymes, metallic nanoparticles, carbon nanotubes, polymers or complexing agents. The electrode ink composition is chosen according to the final application and the selectivity and sensitivity required for the analysis.

The electrode manufacturing process involves the sequential deposition of different layers of conductive and/or insulating inks on the substrates of interest. The process consists of several stages:

- Film deposition usually on plastic or ceramic.
- Drying of the printed films, thus eliminating possible organic solvents needed to produce a proper adhesion. Drying can be done in an oven at temperatures between 300 and 1200 °C, or in cold cured ink with a subsequent UV light photocuring process.
- The process can be repeated if complex structures are required using the appropriate material for the specific design.

On the other hand, as mentioned above, the most commonly used inks are silver and carbon, therefore, their printing and manufacturing characteristics should be highlighted:

- Silver ink. This ink acts as a conductor, while the working electrodes are printed mainly with graphite inks, although gold, platinum and silver inks are also used. Some ink components induce differences in detection and analysis.
- Silver/silver chloride ink. Silver/silver chloride is an industry preferred reference electrode because it has stable electrochemical potential under numerous measurement conditions. This makes silver/silver chloride ink a good choice for a variety of medical and industrial applications that require conductive ink, such as biometric monitoring or heavy metal detection. The properties of the ink can be adjusted by changing the ratio of silver to silver chloride.
- Carbon ink. The electrodes composition is usually confidential information from the manufacturing company, however, there are key elements for the electrodes composition such as binders, used to improve the affinity of the substrate and ink, and solvents employed to improve the viscosity for the printing process. The type, size or charge of the graphite particles and the printing and drying conditions could affect the electron transfer and the analytical yield of the carbon sensors.
- Gold ink. Gold ink is currently generating more interest due to the formation of self-assembling monolayers (SAM) by means of strong Au-S bonds.

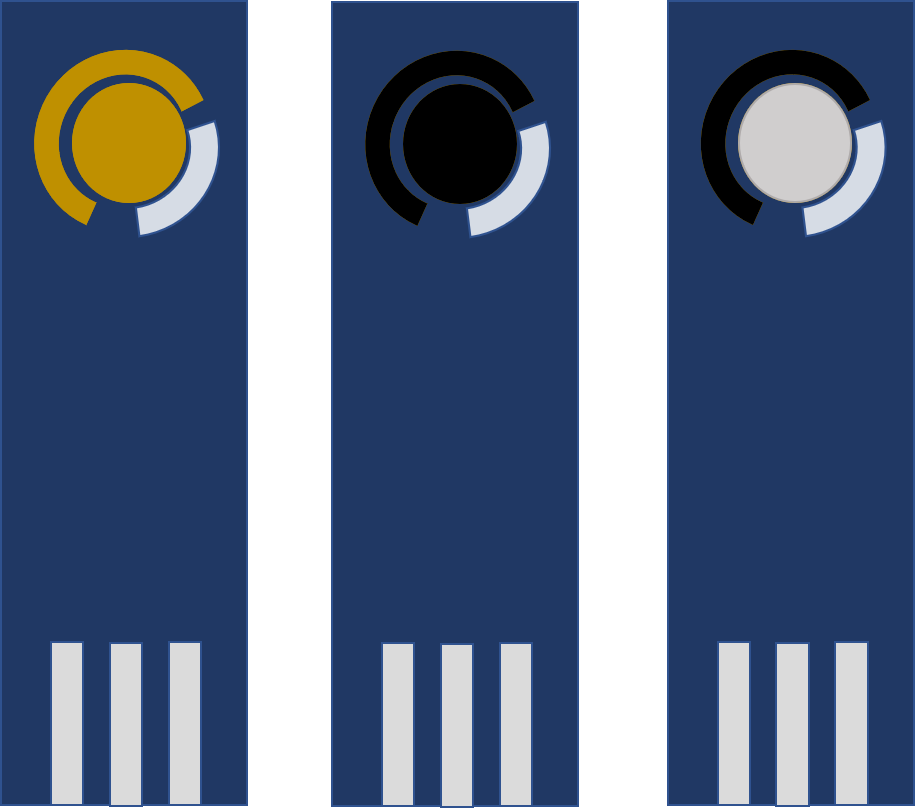
Screen printed electrodes with gold, carbon and silver ink respectively

== Advantages and applications ==
Screen-printed electrodes offer several advantages such as low cost, flexibility of their design, great reproducibility of the process and of the electrodes obtained, the possibility of manufacturing them with different materials and the wide capacity of modification of the work surface. Another advantage is the possibility of connection to a portable instrumentation allowing the in-situ determination of specific analytes. In addition, screen-printed electrodes avoid tedious cleaning processes.

Currently, they are used as a support to produce portable electrochemical biosensors for environmental analysis. Some applications are:

- Phenolic compounds: their quick detection from electrochemical biosensors based on SPE is a challenge because they easily penetrate plants, animals and humans through their membranes and skins, producing toxic side effects.
- Nitrite and phosphate: their detection at low levels is of great importance due to their toxicity. SPEs capable of detecting nitrite and phosphate have been designed. Micro-electrodes combined with screen-printing technology have been used to manufacture nitrite-sensitive sensors.
- Pesticides: Organophosphate pesticides are harmful to humans and animals because they inhibit the activity of many enzymes. Nowadays, inhibition biosensors based on SPEs have emerged.
- Herbicides: Drinking water is contaminated due to the increased use of herbicides. To achieve selective detection, the most common method is the immunoassay which, combined with SPEs, is detected directly avoiding the cleaning and reuse of active components.
- Heavy metal detection: simple and economic devices are needed for in-situ detection of heavy metals, due to their high toxicity even at low concentrations. The most common toxic metal ions are Pb (II) and Hg (II)
1. Pb (II): Sensors for lead detection are usually modified with certain materials (carbon, bismuth or gold among others) to increase their sensitivity. To improve their detection, these modifiers are attached to the SPEs surface. The most widely used is bismuth due to its great yield and improved sensitivity, reaching the level of parts per billion (ppb).
2. Hg (II): mercury is the most problematic pollutant. Generally, gold electrodes are used for detection due to their high affinity. However, the use of gold electrodes produces structural changes on the surface caused to the formation of amalgam. Commercially available screen-printed gold electrodes make mercury measurements in water easier because no electrode preparation is required.
- Generation of SERS substrates. During the last years SPE have been used to generate in-situ SERS substrates for analytical purposes.

On the other hand, a correct manufacturing process is important to avoid low reproducibilities, to encourage mineral binders or insulating polymers that achieve a high resistance of SPE, and to use inks that do not significantly affect the kinetics of the reactions that take place. In manufacturing, surface treatments are used to remove organic contaminants from the ink. This improves their electrochemical properties by increasing the surface roughness.
