= Nonlocal =

Nonlocal may refer to:

- Action at a distance, direct interaction of physical objects that are not in proximity
  - Quantum nonlocality, nonlocal phenomena in quantum mechanics
- Conjugated system (or nonlocalized bond), in chemistry, a system of connected p-orbitals with delocalized electrons in compounds with alternating single and multiple bonds, which in general may lower the overall energy of the molecule and increase stability
- Nonlocal goto, an abstract representation of the control state of a computer program
- Nonlocal Lagrangian, in field theory, a type of functional $\mathcal L\phi(x)$ which contains terms which are nonlocal in the fields i.e. which are not polynomials or functions of the fields or their derivatives evaluated at a single point in the space of dynamical parameters (e.g. space-time)
  - Other nonlocal relationships in physics, such as Pippard's nonlocal generalisation of the Londons' equations for superconductivity
- Non-local means, an algorithm in image processing for image denoising
- Nonlocal operator, which maps functions on a topological space to functions, in such a way that the value of the output function at a given point cannot be determined solely from the values of the input function in any neighbourhood of any point
- Non-local variable, in programming language theory, a variable that is not defined in the local scope
  - nonlocal, a statement in Python 3 that causes identifiers to refer to their bindings in outer enclosing scopes
