= Fractional Laplacian =

Nonlocal mathematical operator

In mathematical analysis, the fractional Laplacian is an operator that generalizes the notion of the Laplace operator to fractional powers of spatial derivatives. It is frequently used in the analysis of nonlocal partial differential equations, especially in geometry and diffusion theory. Applications include:

- Global dissipative half-harmonic flows into spheres: small data in critical Sobolev spaces
- Half-harmonic gradient flow: aspects of a non-local geometric PDE
- Well-posedness of half-harmonic map heat flows for rough initial data

Each of these replaces the classical Laplacian in a geometric PDE with the half-Laplacian $(-\Delta)^{1/2}$ to account for nonlocal effects.

== Definition ==
In the literature, the definition of the fractional Laplacian often varies, but most of the time those definitions are equivalent. The following is a short overview proven by Kwaśnicki, M.

Let $p \in [1, \infty)$ and $\mathcal{X} := L^p(\mathbb{R}^n)$ or let $\mathcal{X} := C_0(\mathbb{R}^n)$ or $\mathcal{X} := C_{bu}(\mathbb{R}^n)$, where:

- $C_0(\mathbb{R}^n)$ denotes the space of continuous functions $f : \mathbb{R}^n \to \mathbb{R}$ that vanish at infinity, i.e., $\forall \varepsilon > 0, \exists K \subset \mathbb{R}^n$ compact such that $|f(x)| < \epsilon$ for all $x \notin K$.
- $C_{bu}(\mathbb{R}^n)$ denotes the space of bounded uniformly continuous functions $f : \mathbb{R}^n \to \mathbb{R}$, i.e., functions that are uniformly continuous, meaning $\forall \epsilon > 0, \exists \delta > 0$ such that $|f(x) - f(y)| < \epsilon$ for all $x, y \in \mathbb{R}^n$ with $|x - y| < \delta$, and bounded, meaning $\exists M > 0$ such that $|f(x)| \leq M$ for all $x \in \mathbb{R}^n$.

Additionally, let $s \in (0, 1)$.

=== Fourier definition ===
If we further restrict to $p \in [1,2]$, we get

$$(-\Delta)^s f := \mathcal{F}_{ \xi}^{-1}(| \xi|^{2s} \mathcal{F}(f))$$

This definition uses the Fourier transform for $f \in L^p( \mathbb{R}^n)$. This definition can also be broadened through the Bessel potential to all $p \in [1, \infty)$.

=== Singular operator ===
The Laplacian can also be viewed as a singular integral operator which is defined as the following limit taken in $\mathcal{X}$.

$$(-\Delta)^s f(x) = \frac{4^s \Gamma(\frac{d}{2}+s)}{\pi^{d/2} |\Gamma(-s)|} \lim_{r \to 0^+} \int\limits_{\mathbb{R}^d \setminus B_r (x)}{\frac{f(x)-f(y)}{|x-y|^{d+2s}}\,dy}$$

=== Generator of C_{0}-semigroup ===
Using the fractional heat-semigroup which is the family of operators $\{P_t \}_{t \in [0,\infty)}$, we can define the fractional Laplacian through its generator.

$$-(-\Delta)^s f(x) = \lim_{t \to 0^+} \frac{P_t f - f}{ t}.$$

It is to note that the generator is not the fractional Laplacian $(-\Delta)^s$ but the negative of it $-(-\Delta)^s$. The operator $P_t : \mathcal{X} \to \mathcal{X}$ is defined by

$$P_t f := p_t * f$$,

where $*$ is the convolution of two functions and $p_t := \mathcal{F}^{-1}_{ \xi}(e^{ - t | \xi|^{2s}})$.

=== Distributional definition ===
For all Schwartz functions $\varphi$, the fractional Laplacian can be defined in a distributional sense by

$$\int_{\mathbb{R}^d} (-\Delta)^s f(y) \varphi(y) \, dy = \int_{\mathbb{R}^d} f(x) (-\Delta)^s \varphi(x) \, dx$$

where $(-\Delta)^s \varphi$ is defined as in the Fourier definition.

=== Bochner's Definition ===
The fractional Laplacian can be expressed using Bochner's integral as

$$(-\Delta)^s f = \frac{1}{\Gamma(-\frac{s}{2})} \int_0^\infty \left( e^{t \Delta} f - f \right) t^{-1 - s/2} \, dt$$

where the integral is understood in the Bochner sense for $\mathcal{X}$-valued functions.

=== Balakrishnan's definition ===
Alternatively, it can be defined via Balakrishnan's formula:

$$(-\Delta)^s f = \frac{\sin \left( \frac{s \pi}{2} \right)}{\pi} \int_0^\infty (-\Delta) \left( s I - \Delta \right)^{-1} f \, s^{s/2 - 1} \, ds$$

with the integral interpreted as a Bochner integral for $\mathcal{X}$-valued functions.

=== Dynkin's definition ===
Another approach by Dynkin defines the fractional Laplacian as

$$(-\Delta)^s f = \lim_{r \to 0^+} \frac{2^s \Gamma\left( \frac{d + s}{2} \right)}{\pi^{d/2} \Gamma\left( -\frac{s}{2} \right)} \int_{\mathbb{R}^d \setminus \overline{B}(x, r)} \frac{f(x + z) - f(x)}{|z|^d \left( |z|^2 - r^2 \right)^{s/2}} \, dz$$

with the limit taken in $\mathcal{X}$.

=== Quadratic form definition ===
In $\mathcal{X} = L^2$, the fractional Laplacian can be characterized via a quadratic form:

$$\langle (-\Delta)^{\frac{s}{2}} f, \varphi \rangle = \mathcal{E}(f, \varphi)$$

where

$$\mathcal{E}(f, g) = \frac{2^s \Gamma\left( \frac{d + s}{2} \right)}{2 \pi^{d/2} \Gamma\left( -\frac{s}{2} \right)} \int_{\mathbb{R}^d} \int_{\mathbb{R}^d} \frac{(f(y) - f(x)) (\overline{g(y)} - \overline{g(x)})}{|x - y|^{d + s}} \, dx \, dy$$

=== Inverse of the Riesz potential definition ===
When $s < d$ and $\mathcal{X} = L^p$ for $p \in [1, \frac{d}{s})$, the fractional Laplacian satisfies

$$\frac{\Gamma\left( \frac{d - s}{2} \right)}{2^s \pi^{d/2} \Gamma\left( \frac{s}{2} \right)} \int_{\mathbb{R}^d} \frac{(-\Delta)^s f(x + z)}{|z|^{d - s}} \, dz = f(x)$$

=== Harmonic extension definition ===
The fractional Laplacian can also be defined through harmonic extensions. Specifically, there exists a function $u(x, y)$ such that

$$\begin{cases}
\Delta_x u(x, y) + \alpha^2 c_\alpha^{2 / \alpha} y^{2 - 2/\alpha} \partial_y^2 u(x, y) = 0 & \text{for } y > 0, \\
u(x, 0) = f(x), \\
\partial_y u(x, 0) = -(-\Delta)^s f(x),
\end{cases}$$

where $c_\alpha = 2^{-\alpha} \frac{|\Gamma\left( -\frac{\alpha}{2} \right)|}{\Gamma\left( \frac{\alpha}{2} \right)}$ and $u(\cdot, y)$ is a function in $\mathcal{X}$ that depends continuously on $y \in [0, \infty)$ with $\|u(\cdot, y)\|_{\mathcal{X}}$ bounded for all $y \geq 0$.

== Relation to other operators ==
=== Riesz transforms and the half-Laplacian ===
In dimension one, the Hilbert transform $\mathcal{H}$ satisfies the identity

$$(-\Delta)^{1/2} = \mathcal{H} \circ \partial_x.$$

This expresses the half-Laplacian as the composition of the Hilbert transform with the spatial derivative.

In higher dimensions $\mathbb{R}^n$, this generalizes naturally to the vector-valued Riesz transform. For a function $f : \mathbb{R}^n \to \mathbb{R}$, the $j$-th Riesz transform is defined as the singular integral operator

$$R_j f(x) = c_n \, \mathrm{p.v.} \int_{\mathbb{R}^n} \frac{x_j - y_j}{|x - y|^{n+1}} f(y)\, dy.$$

Equivalently, it is a Fourier multiplier with symbol

$$\widehat{R_j f}(\xi) = -i \frac{\xi_j}{|\xi|} \hat{f}(\xi).$$

Letting $Rf = (R_1 f, \dots, R_n f)$ and $\nabla f = (\partial_1 f, \dots, \partial_n f)$, we obtain the key identity:

$$(-\Delta)^{1/2} f = \sum_{j=1}^n R_j(\partial_j f) = \operatorname{div}(R f).$$

This follows directly from the Fourier symbols:

$$\widehat{(-\Delta)^{1/2}f}(\xi) = |\xi| \hat{f}(\xi),\quad \widehat{R_j(\partial_j f)}(\xi) = \frac{\xi_j^2}{|\xi|} \hat{f}(\xi).$$

Summing over $j$ recovers $|\xi| \hat{f}(\xi)$, hence the identity holds in the sense of tempered distributions.

== See also ==
- Fractional calculus
- Riemann-Liouville integral
