= Fractional-order system =

In the fields of dynamical systems and control theory, a fractional-order system is a dynamical system that can be modeled by a fractional differential equation containing derivatives of non-integer order. Such systems are said to have fractional dynamics. Derivatives and integrals of fractional orders are used to describe objects that can be characterized by power-law nonlocality, power-law long-range dependence or fractal properties. Fractional-order systems are useful in studying the anomalous behavior of dynamical systems in physics, electrochemistry, biology, viscoelasticity and chaotic systems.

== Definition ==
A general dynamical system of fractional order can be written in the form
$$H(D^{\alpha_1,\alpha_2,\ldots,\alpha_m})(y_1,y_2,\ldots,y_l) = G(D^{\beta_1,\beta_2,\ldots,\beta_n})(u_1,u_2,\ldots,u_k)$$
where $H$ and $G$ are functions of the fractional derivative operator $D$ of orders $\alpha_1,\alpha_2,\ldots,\alpha_m$ and $\beta_1,\beta_2,\ldots,\beta_n$ and $y_i$ and $u_j$ are functions of time. A common special case of this is the linear time-invariant (LTI) system in one variable:
$$\left(\sum_{k=0}^m a_k D^{\alpha_k}\right) y(t) = \left(\sum_{k=0}^n b_k D^{\beta_k}\right) u(t)$$

The orders $\alpha_k$ and $\beta_k$ are in general complex quantities, but two interesting cases are when the orders are commensurate,
$$\alpha_k, \beta_k = k \delta, \quad \delta \in R^+,$$
and when they are also rational:
$$\alpha_k, \beta_k = k \delta, \quad \delta = \frac{1}{q}, q \in Z^+.$$

When $q=1$, the derivatives are of integer order and the system becomes an ordinary differential equation. Thus by increasing specialization, LTI systems can be of general order, commensurate order, rational order or integer order.

=== Transfer function ===
By applying a Laplace transform to the LTI system above, the transfer function becomes
$$G(s) = \frac{Y(s)}{U(s)} = \frac{\sum_{k=0}^n b_k s^{\beta_k}}{\sum_{k=0}^m a_k s^{\alpha_k}}$$

For general orders $\alpha_k$ and $\beta_k$ this is a non-rational transfer function. Non-rational transfer functions cannot be written as an expansion in a finite number of terms (e.g., a binomial expansion would have an infinite number of terms) and in this sense fractional orders systems can be said to have the potential for unlimited memory.

== Motivation to study fractional-order systems ==
Exponential laws are a classical approach to study dynamics of population densities, but there are many systems where dynamics undergo faster or slower-than-exponential laws. In such case the anomalous changes in dynamics may be best described by Mittag-Leffler functions.

Anomalous diffusion is one more dynamic system where fractional-order systems play significant role to describe the anomalous flow in the diffusion process.

Viscoelasticity is the property of material in which the material exhibits its nature between purely elastic and pure fluid. In case of real materials the relationship between stress and strain given by Hooke's law and Newton's law both have obvious disadvances. So G. W. Scott Blair introduced a new relationship between stress and strain given by
$$\sigma (t)=E{D_t^\alpha} \varepsilon(t), \quad 0<\alpha<1.$$

In chaos theory, it has been observed that chaos occurs in dynamical systems of order 3 or more. With the introduction of fractional-order systems, some researchers study chaos in the system of total order less than 3.

In neuroscience, it has been found that single rat neocortical pyramidal neurons adapt with a time scale that depends on the time scale of changes in stimulus statistics. This multiple time scale adaptation is consistent with fractional order differentiation, such that the neuron's firing rate is a fractional derivative of slowly varying stimulus parameters.

== Analysis of fractional differential equations ==
Consider a fractional-order initial value problem:
$${_0^C D_t^\alpha} x(t)=f(t,x(t)) , \quad t\in [0,T], \quad  x(0)=x_0, \quad 0<\alpha<1.$$

=== Existence and uniqueness ===
Here, under the continuity condition on function f, one can convert the above equation into corresponding integral equation.
$$x(t)=x_0 + {_0^C D_t^{-\alpha}}f(t,x(t)) = x_0 + \frac{1}{\Gamma(\alpha)}\int_0^t \frac{f(s,x(s))\,ds}{(t-s)^{1-\alpha}},$$

One can construct a solution space and define, by that equation, a continuous self-map on the solution space, then apply a fixed-point theorem, to get a fixed-point, which is the solution of above equation.

=== Numerical simulation ===
For numerical simulation of solution of the above equations, Kai Diethelm has suggested fractional linear multistep Adams–Bashforth method or quadrature methods.

== See also ==
- Acoustic attenuation
- Differintegral
- Fractional calculus
- Fractional order control
- Fractional order integrator
- Fractional Schrödinger equation
- Fractional quantum mechanics
