= Katugampola fractional operators =

Mathematical operators

In mathematics, Katugampola fractional operators are integral operators that generalize the Riemann–Liouville and the Hadamard fractional operators into a unique form. The Katugampola fractional integral generalizes both the Riemann–Liouville fractional integral and the Hadamard fractional integral into a single form and It is also closely related to the Erdelyi–Kober operator that generalizes the Riemann–Liouville fractional integral. Katugampola fractional derivative has been defined using the Katugampola fractional integral and as with any other fractional differential operator, it also extends the possibility of taking real number powers or complex number powers of the integral and differential operators.

== Definitions ==
These operators have been defined on the following extended-Lebesgue space..

Let $\textit{X}^p_c(a,b), \; c\in \mathbb{R}, \, 1 \leq p \leq \infty$ be the space of those Lebesgue measurable functions $f$ on $[a, b]$ for which $\|f\|_{\textit{X}^p_c} < \infty$, where the norm is defined by
$$\begin{align}
\|f\|_{\textit{X}^p_c} =\left(\int^b_a |t^c f(t)|^p \frac{dt}{t}\right)^{1/p} < \infty,
\end{align}$$
for $1 \leq p < \infty,\, c \in \mathbb{R}$ and for the case $p=\infty$
$$\begin{align}
\|f\|_{\textit{X}^\infty_c} = \text{ess sup}_{a \leq t \leq b} [t^c|f(t)|],  \quad ( c \in \mathbb{R}).
\end{align}$$

== Katugampola fractional integral ==
It is defined via the following integrals

$({}^\rho \mathcal{I}^\alpha_{a+}f)(x) = \frac{\rho^{1- \alpha }}{\Gamma(\alpha)} \int^x_a \frac{\tau^{\rho-1} f(\tau) }{(x^\rho - \tau^\rho)^{1-\alpha}}\, d\tau,$	1

for $x > a$ and $\operatorname{Re}(\alpha) > 0.$ This integral is called the left-sided fractional integral. Similarly, the right-sided fractional integral is defined by,

$({}^\rho \mathcal{I}^\alpha_{b-}f)(x) = \frac{\rho^{1- \alpha }}{\Gamma({\alpha})} \int^b_x \frac{\tau^{\rho-1} f(\tau) }{(\tau^\rho - x^\rho)^{1-\alpha}}\, d\tau.$	2

for $\textstyle x < b$ and $\textstyle\operatorname{Re}(\alpha) > 0$.

These are the fractional generalizations of the $n$-fold left- and right-integrals of the form

$$\int_a^x t_1^{\rho-1} \, dt_1 \int_a^{t_1} t_2^{\rho-1} \,dt_2 \cdots \int_a^{t_{n -1}} t_n^{\rho-1} f(t_n)\,dt_n$$

and

$\int_x^b t_1^{\rho-1} \,dt_1 \int^b_{t_1} t_2^{\rho-1} \,dt_2 \cdots \int^b_{t_{n -1}} t_n^{\rho-1} f(t_n) \, dt_n$ for $\textstyle n \in \mathbb{N},$

respectively. Even though the integral operators in question are close resemblance of the famous Erdélyi–Kober operator, it is not possible to obtain the Hadamard fractional integrals as a direct consequence of the Erdélyi–Kober operators. Also, there is a corresponding fractional derivative, which generalizes the Riemann–Liouville and the Hadamard fractional derivatives. As with the case of fractional integrals, the same is not true for the Erdélyi–Kober operator.

== Katugampola fractional derivative ==
As with the case of other fractional derivatives, it is defined via the Katugampola fractional integral.

Let $\alpha \in \mathbb{C},\ \operatorname{Re}(\alpha) \geq 0, n=[\operatorname{Re}(\alpha)]+1$ and $\rho >0.$ The generalized fractional derivatives, corresponding to the generalized fractional integrals (1) and (2) are defined, respectively, for $0 \leq a < x < b \leq \infty$, by

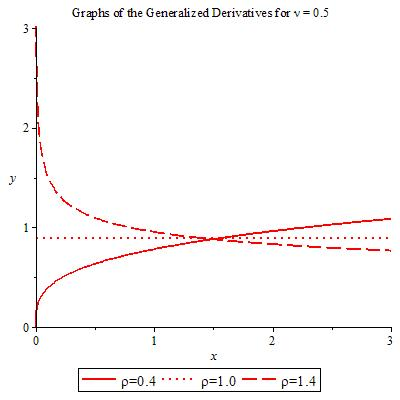
The half-derivative of the function $f(x) = x^{0.5}$ for the Katugampola fractional derivative.

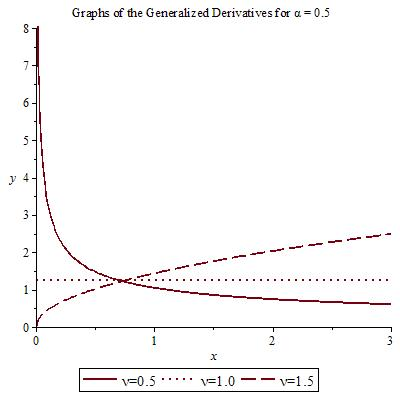
The half derivative of the function $f(x) = x^\nu$ for the Katugampola fractional derivative for $\alpha = 0.5$ and $\rho = 2$.

$$\begin{align}
\big({}^\rho \mathcal{D}^\alpha_{a+}f\big)(x)&= \bigg(x^{1-\rho} \,\frac{d}{dx}\bigg)^n\,\, \big({}^\rho \mathcal{I}^{n-\alpha}_{a+}f\big)(x)\\
&= \frac{\rho^{\alpha-n+1 }}{\Gamma({n-\alpha})} \, \bigg(x^{1-\rho} \,\frac{d}{dx}\bigg)^n \int^x_a \frac{\tau^{\rho-1} f(\tau) }{(x^\rho - \tau^\rho)^{\alpha-n+1}}\, d\tau,
\end{align}$$

and

$$\begin{align}
\big({}^\rho \mathcal{D}^\alpha_{b-}f\big)(x) &= \bigg(-x^{1-\rho} \,\frac{d}{dx}\bigg)^n\,\, \big({}^\rho \mathcal{I}^{n-\alpha}_{b-}f\big)(x)\\
&= \frac{\rho^{\alpha-n+1 }}{\Gamma({n-\alpha})}\bigg(-x^{1-\rho}\frac{d}{dx}\bigg)^n \int^b_x\frac{\tau^{\rho-1} f(\tau) }{(\tau^\rho - x^\rho)^{\alpha-n+1}}\, d\tau,
\end{align}$$

respectively, if the integrals exist.

These operators generalize the Riemann–Liouville and Hadamard fractional derivatives into a single form, while the Erdelyi–Kober fractional is a generalization of the Riemann–Liouville fractional derivative. When, $b=\infty$, the fractional derivatives are referred to as Weyl-type derivatives.

=== Caputo–Katugampola fractional derivative ===
There is a Caputo-type modification of the Katugampola derivative that is now known as the Caputo–Katugampola fractional derivative. Let $f \in L^1[a, b], \alpha \in (0, 1]$ and $\rho$. The C-K fractional derivative of order $\alpha$ of the function $f:[a,b] \rightarrow \mathbb{R},$ with respect to parameter $\rho$ can be expressed as

$${}^C\mathcal{D}^{\alpha, \rho}_{a+}f(t)=\frac{\rho^\alpha t^{1-\alpha}}{\Gamma(1-\alpha)}\frac{d}{dt}\int^t_a\frac{s^{\rho-1}}{(t^\rho-s^\rho)^\alpha}\big[f(s)-f(a)\big]\,ds.$$

It satisfies the following result. Assume that $f \in C^1[a, b]$, then the C-K derivative has the following equivalent form

$${}^C\mathcal{D}^{\alpha, \rho}_{a+}f(t)=\frac{\rho^\alpha }{\Gamma(1-\alpha)}\int^t_a \frac{f^\prime(s)}{(t^\rho-s^\rho)^\alpha}ds.$$

=== Hilfer–Katugampola fractional derivative ===
Another recent generalization is the Hilfer-Katugampola fractional derivative. Let order $0<\alpha<1$ and type $0\leq{\beta}\leq{1}$. The fractional derivative (left-sided/right-sided), with respect to $x$, with $\rho>0$, is defined by

$$\begin{align}
({^{\rho}\mathcal{D}^{\alpha,\beta}_{a\pm}}\varphi)(x)&=\left(\pm\,{^{\rho}\mathcal{J}_{a\pm}^{\beta(1-\alpha)}}\left(t^{\rho-1}\frac{d}{dt}\right){^{\rho}\mathcal{J}_{a\pm}^{(1-\beta)(1-\alpha)}}\varphi\right)(x)\\
&=\left(\pm\,{^{\rho}\mathcal{J}_{a\pm}^{\beta(1-\alpha)}}\delta_{\rho}\,{^{\rho}\mathcal{J}_{a\pm}^{(1-\beta)(1-\alpha)}}\varphi\right)(x),
\end{align}$$

where $\delta_{\rho}= t^{\rho-1}\frac{d}{dt}$, for functions $\varphi$ in which the expression on the right hand side exists, where $\mathcal{J}$ is the generalized fractional integral given in (1).

== Mellin transform ==
As in the case of Laplace transforms, Mellin transforms will be used specially when solving differential equations. The Mellin transforms of the left-sided and right-sided versions of Katugampola Integral operators are given by

=== Theorem ===
Let $\alpha \in \mathcal{C},\ \operatorname{Re}(\alpha) > 0,$ and $\rho >0.$ Then,
$$\begin{align}
& \mathcal{M}\bigg({}^\rho \mathcal{I}^\alpha_{a+}f\bigg)(s) = \frac{\Gamma\big(1-\frac{s}{\rho}-\alpha\big)}{\Gamma\big(1-\frac{s}{\rho}\big)\,\rho^\alpha}\, \mathcal{M}f(s + \alpha\rho), \quad \operatorname{Re}(s/\rho + \alpha) < 1, \, x > a,    \\
& \mathcal{M}\bigg({}^\rho \mathcal{I}^\alpha_{b-}f\bigg)(s) = \frac{\Gamma\big(\frac{s}{\rho}\big)}{\Gamma\big(\frac{s}{\rho} + \alpha\big)\,\rho^\alpha}\, \mathcal{M}f(s + \alpha\rho), \quad \operatorname{Re}(s/\rho) > 0, \, x < b,
\end{align}$$

for $f \in \textit{X}^1_{s + \alpha\rho}(\R^+)$, if $\mathcal{M} f(s + \alpha\rho)$ exists for $s \in \mathbb{C}$.

== Hermite-Hadamard type inequalities ==
Katugampola operators satisfy the following Hermite-Hadamard type inequalities:

=== Theorem ===
Let $\alpha > 0$ and $\rho > 0$. If $f$ is a convex function on $[a, b]$, then
$$f\left(\frac{a+b}{2}\right) \leq \frac{\rho^\alpha \Gamma(\alpha +1)}{4(b^\alpha -a^\alpha)^\alpha}\left[{}^\rho \mathcal{I}^\alpha_{a+}F(b)+{}^\rho \mathcal{I}^\alpha_{b-}F(a)\right] \leq \frac{f(a)+f(b)}{2},$$
where $F(x) = f(x) + f(a+b-x), \; x \in [a, b]$.

When $\rho \rightarrow 0^+$, in the above result, the following Hadamard type inequality holds:

=== Corollary ===
Let $\alpha > 0$. If $f$ is a convex function on $[a, b]$, then
$$f\left(\frac{a+b}{2}\right) \leq \frac{\Gamma(\alpha +1)}{4\left(\ln \frac{b}{a}\right)^\alpha}\left[ \mathbf{I}^\alpha_{a+}F(b)+ \mathbf{I}^\alpha_{b-}F(a)\right] \leq \frac{f(a)+f(b)}{2},$$
where $\mathbf{I}^\alpha_{a+}$ and $\mathbf{I}^\alpha_{b-}$ are left- and right-sided Hadamard fractional integrals.

== Notes ==
The CRONE (R) Toolbox, a Matlab and Simulink Toolbox dedicated to fractional calculus, can be downloaded at http://cronetoolbox.ims-bordeaux.fr
