= Erdelyi–Kober operator =

In mathematics, an Erdélyi–Kober operator is a fractional integration operation introduced by Arthur Erdélyi (1940) and Hermann Kober (1940).

The Erdélyi–Kober fractional integral is given by

$$\frac{x^{-\nu-\alpha+1}}{\Gamma(\alpha)}\int_0^x (t-x)^{\alpha-1}t^{-\alpha-\nu}f(t) dt$$

which generalizes the Riemann fractional integral and the Weyl integral.
