= Initialized fractional calculus =

In mathematical analysis, initialization of the differintegrals is a topic in fractional calculus, a branch of mathematics dealing with derivatives of non-integer order.

== Composition rule of Differintegrals ==
The composition law of the differintegral operator states that although:

$\mathbb{D}^q\mathbb{D}^{-q} = \mathbb{I}$

wherein D^{−q} is the left inverse of D^{q}, the converse is not necessarily true:

$$\mathbb{D}^{-q}\mathbb{D}^q \neq \mathbb{I}$$

=== Example ===
Consider elementary integer-order calculus. Below is an integration and differentiation using the example function $3x^2+1$:

$$\frac{d}{dx}\left[\int (3x^2+1)dx\right] = \frac{d}{dx}[x^3+x+C] = 3x^2+1\,,$$

Now, on exchanging the order of composition:

$$\int \left[\frac{d}{dx}(3x^2+1)\right] = \int 6x \,dx = 3x^2+C\,,$$

Where C is the constant of integration. Even if it was not obvious, the initialized condition ƒ'(0) = C, ƒ''(0) = D, etc. could be used. If we neglected those initialization terms, the last equation would show the composition of integration, and differentiation (and vice versa) would not hold.

== Description of initialization ==
Working with a properly initialized differ integral is the subject of initialized fractional calculus. If the differ integral is initialized properly, then the hoped-for composition law holds. The problem is that in differentiation, information is lost, as with C in the first equation.

However, in fractional calculus, given that the operator has been fractionalized and is thus continuous, an entire complementary function is needed. This is called complementary function $\Psi$.

$$\mathbb{D}^q_t f(t) = \frac{1}{\Gamma(n-q)}\frac{d^n}{dt^n}\int_0^t (t-\tau)^{n-q-1}f(\tau)\,d\tau + \Psi(x)$$

== See also ==
- Initial conditions
- Dynamical systems
