= Stokes formula =

Stokes' formula can refer to:

- Stokes' law for friction force in a viscous fluid.
- Stokes' law (sound attenuation) law describing attenuation of sound in Newtonian liquids.
- Stokes' theorem on the integration of differential forms.
- Stokes' formula (gravity) a formula in geodesy
