= Cauchy formula for repeated integration =

Method in mathematics

The Cauchy formula for repeated integration, named after Augustin-Louis Cauchy, allows one to compress n antiderivatives of a function into a single integral. For non-integer n it yields the definition of fractional integrals and (with n < 0) fractional derivatives.

== Scalar case ==
Let f be a continuous function on the real line. Then the nth repeated integral of f with base-point a,
$$f^{(-n)}(x) = \int_a^x \int_a^{\sigma_1} \cdots \int_a^{\sigma_{n-1}} f(\sigma_{n}) \, \mathrm{d}\sigma_{n} \cdots \, \mathrm{d}\sigma_2 \, \mathrm{d}\sigma_1,$$
is given by single integration
$$f^{(-n)}(x) = \frac{1}{(n-1)!} \int_a^x\left(x-t\right)^{n-1} f(t)\,\mathrm{d}t.$$

=== Proof ===
A proof is given by induction. The base case with n = 1 is trivial, since it is equivalent to
$$f^{(-1)}(x) = \frac1{0!} \int_a^x {(x - t)^0} f(t)\,\mathrm{d}t = \int_a^x f(t)\,\mathrm{d}t.$$

Now, suppose this is true for n, and let us prove it for n + 1. Firstly, using the Leibniz integral rule, note that
$$\frac{\mathrm{d}}{\mathrm{d}x} \left[ \frac{1}{n!} \int_a^x (x - t)^n f(t)\,\mathrm{d}t \right] =
\frac{1}{(n - 1)!} \int_a^x (x - t)^{n-1} f(t)\,\mathrm{d}t.$$
Then, applying the induction hypothesis,
$$\begin{align}
f^{-(n+1)}(x) &= \int_a^x \int_a^{\sigma_1} \cdots \int_a^{\sigma_n} f(\sigma_{n+1}) \,\mathrm{d}\sigma_{n+1} \cdots \,\mathrm{d}\sigma_2 \,\mathrm{d}\sigma_1 \\
&= \int_a^x \left[\int_a^{\sigma_1} \cdots \int_a^{\sigma_n} f(\sigma_{n+1}) \,\mathrm{d}\sigma_{n+1} \cdots \,\mathrm{d}\sigma_2 \right] \,\mathrm{d}\sigma_1.
\end{align}$$
Note that the term within square bracket has n-times successive integration, and upper limit of outermost integral inside the square bracket is $\sigma_1$. Thus, comparing with the case for n = n and replacing $x, \sigma_1, \cdots, \sigma_n$ of the formula at induction step n = n with $\sigma_1, \sigma_2, \cdots, \sigma_{n+1}$ respectively leads to
$$\int_a^{\sigma_1} \cdots \int_a^{\sigma_n} f(\sigma_{n+1}) \,\mathrm{d}\sigma_{n+1} \cdots \,\mathrm{d}\sigma_2 = \frac{1}{(n - 1)!} \int_a^{\sigma_1} (\sigma_1 - t)^{n-1} f(t)\,\mathrm{d}t.$$
Putting this expression inside the square bracket results in
$$\begin{align}
&= \int_a^x \frac{1}{(n - 1)!} \int_a^{\sigma_1} (\sigma_1 - t)^{n-1} f(t)\,\mathrm{d}t\,\mathrm{d}\sigma_1 \\
&= \int_a^x \frac{\mathrm{d}}{\mathrm{d}\sigma_1} \left[\frac{1}{n!} \int_a^{\sigma_1} (\sigma_1 - t)^n f(t)\,\mathrm{d}t\right] \,\mathrm{d}\sigma_1 \\
&= \frac{1}{n!} \int_a^x (x - t)^n f(t)\,\mathrm{d}t.
\end{align}$$

- It has been shown that this statement holds true for the base case $n = 1$.
- If the statement is true for $n = k$, then it has been shown that the statement holds true for $n = k + 1$.
- Thus this statement has been proven true for all positive integers.

This completes the proof.

== Generalizations and applications ==
The Cauchy formula is generalized to non-integer parameters by the Riemann–Liouville integral, where $n \in \Z_{\geq 0}$ is replaced by $\alpha \in \Complex,\ \Re(\alpha) > 0$, and the factorial is replaced by the gamma function. The two formulas agree when $\alpha \in \Z_{\geq 0}$.

Both the Cauchy formula and the Riemann–Liouville integral are generalized to arbitrary dimensions by the Riesz potential.

In fractional calculus, these formulae can be used to construct a differintegral, allowing one to differentiate or integrate a fractional number of times. Differentiating a fractional number of times can be accomplished by fractional integration, then differentiating the result.
