= Bessel potential =

Mathematical potential

In mathematics, the Bessel potential is a potential (named after Friedrich Wilhelm Bessel) similar to the Riesz potential but with better decay properties at infinity.

If s is a complex number with positive real part then the Bessel potential of order s is the operator

$$(I-\Delta)^{-s/2}$$

where Δ is the Laplace operator and the fractional power is defined using Fourier transforms.

Yukawa potentials are particular cases of Bessel potentials for $s=2$ in the 3-dimensional space.

== Representation in Fourier space ==
The Bessel potential acts by multiplication on the Fourier transforms: for each $\xi \in \mathbb{R}^d$

$$\mathcal{F}((I-\Delta)^{-s/2} u) (\xi)= \frac{\mathcal{F}u (\xi)}{(1 + 4 \pi^2 \vert \xi \vert^2)^{s/2}}.$$

== Integral representations ==
When $s > 0$, the Bessel potential on $\mathbb{R}^d$ can be represented by

$$(I - \Delta)^{-s/2} u = G_s \ast u,$$

where the Bessel kernel $G_s$ is defined for $x \in \mathbb{R}^d \setminus \{0\}$ by the integral formula

$$G_s (x)
= \frac{1}{(4 \pi)^{s/2}\Gamma (s/2)}
\int_0^\infty \frac{e^{-\frac{\pi \vert x \vert^2}{y}-\frac{y}{4 \pi}}}{y^{1 + \frac{d - s}{2}}}\,\mathrm{d}y.$$

Here $\Gamma$ denotes the Gamma function. The Bessel kernel can also be represented for $x \in \mathbb{R}^d \setminus \{0\}$ by

$$G_s (x) = \frac{e^{-\vert x \vert}}{(2\pi)^\frac{d-1}{2} 2^\frac{s}{2} \Gamma (\frac{s}{2}) \Gamma (\frac{d - s + 1}{2})}
\int_0^\infty e^{-\vert x \vert t} \Big(t + \frac{t^2}{2}\Big)^\frac{d - s - 1}{2} \,\mathrm{d}t.$$

This last expression can be more succinctly written in terms of a modified Bessel function, for which the potential gets its name:

$$G_s(x)=\frac{1}{2^{(s-2)/2}(2\pi)^{d/2}\Gamma(\frac{s}{2})}K_{(d-s)/2}(\vert x \vert) \vert x \vert^{(s-d)/2}.$$

== Asymptotics ==
At the origin, one has as $\vert x\vert \to 0$,

$$G_s (x) = \frac{\Gamma (\frac{d - s}{2})}{2^s \pi^{s/2} \vert x\vert^{d - s}}(1 + o (1))  \quad \text{ if } 0 < s < d,$$
$$G_d (x) = \frac{1}{2^{d - 1} \pi^{d/2} }\ln \frac{1}{\vert x \vert}(1 + o (1)) ,$$
$$G_s (x) = \frac{\Gamma (\frac{s - d}{2})}{2^s \pi^{s/2} }(1 + o (1))  \quad \text{ if }s > d.$$

In particular, when $0 < s < d$ the Bessel potential behaves asymptotically as the Riesz potential.

At infinity, one has, as $\vert x\vert \to \infty$,

$$G_s (x) = \frac{e^{-\vert x \vert}}{2^\frac{d + s - 1}{2} \pi^\frac{d - 1}{2} \Gamma (\frac{s}{2}) \vert x \vert^\frac{d + 1 - s}{2}}(1 + o (1)).$$

== See also ==
- Riesz potential
- Fractional integration
- Sobolev space
- Fractional Schrödinger equation
- Yukawa potential
