= Stokes' law (disambiguation) =

Stokes' law can refer to:

- Stokes' law, for friction force
- Stokes' law (sound attenuation), describing attenuation of sound in Newtonian liquids

== See also ==
- Stokes' theorem, in integration
