= Michele Caputo =

Italian geophysicist and geodesist (born 1927)

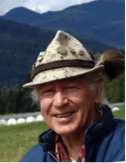
- Born: 5 May 1927 (age 99); Ferrara, Italy
- Education: University of Bologna
- Known for: Caputo fractional derivative
- Scientific career
- Fields: Geophysics; Geodesy; Fractional calculus
- Workplaces: University of Trieste; Sapienza University of Rome; Texas A&M University

Michele Caputo (born 5 May 1927) is an Italian geophysicist, geodesist, and mathematician.

Caputo is known for his formulation of the Caputo fractional derivative.

== Education ==
Caputo obtained degrees in mathematics and physics from the University of Bologna.

== Career ==
In his research on seismological Q-models, Caputo introduced a notion of fractional derivative which now bears his name. For a nonnegative integer $m$ and fractional part $0 < z < 1$, the Caputo fractional derivative of order $m + z$ is defined by
$$\frac{\operatorname{d}^{m+z}}{\operatorname{d}x^{m + z}}\left[ f\left( x \right) \right] = \frac{1}{\operatorname{\Gamma} \left( 1 - z \right)} \int_0^x \frac{f^{\left( m + 1 \right)}\left( t \right)}{\left( x - t \right)^{z}} \, \operatorname{d}t$$
provided that $f$ is smooth on $(0, \infty)$.

Caputo conducted geomagnetic, gravimetric, and glaciological research during the 1954 Italian Karakoram expedition.
