= Nonlocal operator =

Class of operator mapping

In mathematics, a nonlocal operator is a mapping that maps a space of functions on a topological space to another space of functions on some domain in such a way that the value of the function output at a given point cannot be determined solely from the values of the input function in an arbitrary neighbourhood of any point. An example of a nonlocal operator is the Fourier transform.

== Formal definition ==
Let $X$ be a topological space, $Y$ a set, $F(X)$ a function space containing functions with domain $X$, and $G(Y)$ a function space containing functions with domain $Y$. Two functions $u$ and $v$ in $F(X)$ are called equivalent at $x\in X$ if there exists a neighbourhood $N$ of $x$ such that $u(x')=v(x')$ for all $x'\in N$. An operator $A: F(X) \to G(Y)$ is said to be local if for every $y\in Y$ there exists an $x\in X$ such that $Au(y) = Av(y)$ for all functions $u$ and $v$ in $F(X)$ which are equivalent at $x$. A nonlocal operator is an operator which is not local.

For a local operator it is possible (in principle) to compute the value $Au(y)$ using only knowledge of the values of $u$ in an arbitrarily small neighbourhood of a point $x$. For a nonlocal operator this is not possible.

== Examples ==
Differential operators are examples of local operators. A large class of (linear) nonlocal operators is given by the integral transforms, such as the Fourier transform and the Laplace transform. For an integral transform of the form

$$(Au)(y) = \int \limits_X u(x)\, K(x, y)\, dx,$$

where $K$ is some kernel function, it is necessary to know the values of $u$ almost everywhere on the support of $K(\cdot, y)$ in order to compute the value of $Au$ at $y$.

An example of a singular integral operator is the fractional Laplacian

$$(-\Delta)^sf(x) = c_{d,s} \int\limits_{\mathbb{R}^d} \frac{f(x)-f(y)}{|x-y|^{d+2s}}\,dy.$$

The prefactor $c_{d,s} := \frac{4^s\Gamma(d/2+s)}{\pi^{d/2}|\Gamma(-s)|}$ involves the Gamma function and serves as a normalizing factor. The fractional Laplacian plays a role in, for example, the study of nonlocal minimal surfaces.

== Applications ==
Some examples of applications of nonlocal operators are:

- Time series analysis using Fourier transformations
- Analysis of dynamical systems using Laplace transformations
- Image denoising using non-local means
- Modelling Gaussian blur or motion blur in images using convolution with a blurring kernel or point spread function

== See also ==
- Fractional calculus
- Linear map
- Nonlocal Lagrangian
- Action at a distance
