= K. L. Sebastian =

Indian chemist

Kizhakeyil Lukose Sebastian is a professor of chemistry at the department of Inorganic and Physical Chemistry of Indian Institute of Technology, Palakkad, India. Prior to becoming a professor at IIT Palakkad, he was a professor of chemistry at the department of Inorganic and Physical Chemistry at Indian Institute of Science, Bangalore, for about 20 years.

== Education ==
He did his Bachelor of Science (special degree) from the University of Kerala and his Master of Science from the University of Calicut. He stood first in the university when he completed his undergraduate and post graduate studies. In 1976 he received his PhD in chemistry from IISc.

== Career ==
After completing his PhD Prof. Sebastian joined the Calicut University as Reader and Lecturer. He started working as a Professor in the Cochin University of Science and Technology in 1984. He has been Professor of Physical and Inorganic Chemistry at the Indian Institute of Science ever since 1996.

He is one of the leading theoretical chemists of India working on the applications of quantum mechanics and statistical mechanics in chemistry and chemical physics. The topics studied include molecular devices, nanotechnology and surfaces, molecular ratchets, equilibrium and non-equilibrium statistical mechanics of polymers, biophysical chemistry and chemical dynamics. Prof. Sebastian has authored more than 110 papers on various aspects of theoretical chemistry, chemical physics and polymer physics.

He is also a member of the editorial boards of several reputed scientific journals published by institutions such as the Indian Academy of Sciences.

Apart from his research work he also teaches at various levels, including undergraduate students.

== Awards and honors ==
- Fellow of Indian Academy of Sciences, the Indian National Science Academy.
- Shanti Swarup Bhatnagar Prize for Science and Technology in Chemical Science by the Government of India.
- Swadeshi Sastra Puraskar (1996).
- J. C. Bose National Fellowship by the Department of Science & Technology (DST) (2008-2013).
- Amrut Modi Chair Professor in the Chemical Sciences Division of Indian Institute of Science (2008-2011).

His research topics include path integral representation of Fractional Brownian motion, ring closing opening dynamics in polymers, first passage time calculation in phase space, energy transfer between molecule and graphene, quantum coherence etc. He introduced what is known as the kink mechanism for the translocation of long chain molecule through a nano-pore. In other words, Kramers problem for the long chain molecule. He also developed the time dependent version of the coupled cluster theory (CCT) and applied to a problem of ion neutralization scattered from a surface of a metal. He has also proposed an analytical model to elucidate the mechanism of protein transport across the nuclear pore complex. In recent years he got interested in coherences in photosystems and quantum biology in general. Along with his PhD student, he proposed an almost analytical method to analyze the time evolution of the FMO complex. More recently he has started working on Levy flights which involves long jumps and on the dynamics of a tracer in a heterogeneous medium, where diffusivity is a fluctuating quantity.
