= Aleksey Letnikov =

Russian mathematician (1837–1888)

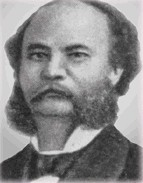
Aleksey Letnikov

Aleksey Vasilyevich Letnikov (Russian: Алексéй Васи́льевич Лéтников, 1837–1888) was a Russian mathematician.

After graduating from the Konstantinovsky State University of Land Use Planning in Moscow, Letnikov attended classes at Moscow University and the Sorbonne. In 1860 he became an Instructor of Mathematics at the Konstantinovsky Institute. He obtained the degrees of Master and Ph.D. from Moscow University in 1868 and 1874 respectively.

In 1868 Letnikov became a professor at the Imperial Moscow Technical School and from 1879 to 1880 was an Inspector at the school. From 1883 he was the principal of the Aleksandrov Commercial School (Russian: Александровское коммерческое училище, currently The State University of Management) and from 1884 he was a Corresponding Member of the Russian Academy of Sciences.

His most renowned contribution to mathematics was the creation of the Grünwald–Letnikov derivative. He also published results in the fields of analytic geometry, ordinary differential equations, and non-Euclidean geometry.

Letnikov died in Moscow in 1888 and was buried in the cemetery of the Novo-Alekseyevsky Monastery.
