= Fractional-order integrator =

A fractional-order integrator or just simply fractional integrator is an integrator device that calculates the fractional-order integral or derivative (usually called a differintegral) of an input. Differentiation or integration is a real or complex parameter. The fractional integrator is useful in fractional-order control where the history of the system under control is important to the control system output.

Some industrial controllers use fractional-order PID controllers (FOPIDs), which have exceeded the performance of standard ones, to the extent that standard ones are sometimes considered as a special case of FOPIDs. Fractional-order integrators and differentiators are the main component of FOPIDs.

== Overview ==
The differintegral operator,
$${}_a \mathbb{D}^q_t \left( f(x) \right)$$
includes the integer-order differentiation and integration operations, and allows a continuous range of non-integer order operations around them. The differintegral parameters a and t describe the range over which to compute the result. The differintegral parameter q may be any real number or complex number: if q is greater than zero, the differintegral computes a derivative; if q is less than zero, the differintegral computes an integral.

The integer order integration can be computed as a Riemann–Liouville differintegral, where the weight of each element in the sum is the constant unit value 1, which is equivalent to the Riemann sum. To compute an integer order derivative, the weights in the summation would be zero, with the exception of the most recent data points, where (in the case of the first unit derivative) the weight of the data point at t − 1 is −1 and the weight of the data point at t is 1. The sum of the points in the input function using these weights results in the difference of the most recent data points. These weights are computed using ratios of the Gamma function incorporating the number of data points in the range [a, t], and the parameter q.

== Digital devices ==
Digital devices have the advantage of being versatile, and are not susceptible to unexpected output variation due to heat or noise. The discrete nature of a computer however, does not allow for all of history to be computed. Some finite range [a, t] must exist. Therefore, the number of data points N that can be stored in memory determines the oldest data point in memory, so that the value a is never more than N samples old. The effect is that any history older than a is completely forgotten, and no longer influences the output.

A solution to this problem is the Coopmans approximation, which allows old data to be forgotten more gracefully (though still with exponential decay, rather than with the power law decay of a purely analog device).

== Analog devices ==
Analog devices have the ability to retain history over longer intervals. This translates into the parameter a staying constant, while t increases.

There is no error due to round-off, as in the case of digital devices, but there may be error in the device due to leakages, and also unexpected variations in behavior caused by heat and noise.

An example fractional-order integrator is a modification of the standard integrator circuit, where a capacitor is used as the feedback impedance on an opamp. By replacing the capacitor with an RC Ladder circuit, a half order integrator, that is, with
$$q = -\frac{1}{2},$$
can be constructed.

== See also ==
- Signal analysis
- Fourier series
