= Acoustic dispersion =

Separation of a sound wave into component frequencies while passing through a material

In acoustics, acoustic dispersion is the phenomenon of a sound wave separating into its component frequencies as it passes through a material. The phase velocity of the sound wave is viewed as a function of frequency. Hence, separation of component frequencies is measured by the rate of change in phase velocities as the radiated waves pass through a given medium.

== Broadband transmission method ==
A widely used technique for determining acoustic dispersion is a broadband transmission method. This technique was originally introduced in 1978 and has been employed to study the dispersion properties of metal (1978), epoxy resin (1986), paper materials (1993), and ultra-sound contrast agent (1998). In 1990 and 1993 this method confirmed the Kramers–Kronig relation for acoustic waves.

Application of this method requires the measurements of a reference velocity to obtain values for the acoustic dispersion. This is accomplished by determining (usually) the speed of the sound in water, the thickness of the specimen, and the phase spectrum of each of the two transmitted ultrasound pulses.

== Dispersive attenuation ==
- Acoustic attenuation

== See also ==
- Dispersion (optics)
