= Caputo fractional derivative =

Generalization in fractional calculus

In mathematics, the Caputo fractional derivative, also called Caputo-type fractional derivative, is a generalization of derivatives for non-integer orders named after Michele Caputo. Caputo first defined this form of fractional derivative in 1967.

== Motivation ==
The Caputo fractional derivative is motivated from the Riemann–Liouville fractional integral. Let $f$ be continuous on $\left( 0,\, \infty \right)$, then the Riemann–Liouville fractional integral ${^{\text{RL}}\operatorname{I}}$ states that

$${_{0}^{\text{RL}}\operatorname{I}_{x}^{\alpha}}\left[ f\left( x \right) \right] = \frac{1}{\Gamma\left( \alpha \right)} \cdot \int\limits_{0}^{x} \frac{f\left( t \right)}{\left( x - t \right)^{1 - \alpha}} \, \operatorname{d}t$$

where $\Gamma\left( \cdot \right)$ is the Gamma function.

Let's define $\operatorname{D}_{x}^{\alpha} := \frac{\operatorname{d}^{\alpha}}{\operatorname{d}x^{\alpha}}$, say that $\operatorname{D}_{x}^{\alpha} \operatorname{D}_{x}^{\beta} = \operatorname{D}_{x}^{\alpha + \beta}$ and that $\operatorname{D}_{x}^{\alpha} = {^{\text{RL}}\operatorname{I}_{x}^{-\alpha}}$ applies. If $\alpha = m + z \in \mathbb{R} \wedge m \in \mathbb{N}_{0} \wedge 0 < z < 1$ then we could say $\operatorname{D}_{x}^{\alpha} = \operatorname{D}_{x}^{m + z} = \operatorname{D}_{x}^{z + m} = \operatorname{D}_{x}^{z - 1 + 1 + m} = \operatorname{D}_{x}^{z - 1}\operatorname{D}_{x}^{1 + m} = {^{\text{RL}}\operatorname{I}}_{x}^{1 - z}\operatorname{D}_{x}^{1 + m}$. So if $f$ is also $C^{m}\left( 0,\, \infty \right)$, then

$${\operatorname{D}_{x}^{m + z}}\left[ f\left( x \right) \right] = \frac{1}{\Gamma\left( 1 - z \right)} \cdot \int\limits_{0}^{x} \frac{f^{\left( 1 + m \right)}\left( t \right)}{\left( x - t \right)^{z}} \, \operatorname{d}t.$$

This is known as the Caputo-type fractional derivative, often written as ${ ^{\text{C}}\operatorname{D}}_{x}^{\alpha}$.

== Definition ==
The first definition of the Caputo-type fractional derivative was given by Caputo as:

$${^{\text{C}}\operatorname{D}_{x}^{m + z}}\left[ f\left( x \right) \right] = \frac{1}{\Gamma\left( 1 - z \right)} \cdot \int\limits_{0}^{x} \frac{f^{\left( m + 1 \right)}\left( t \right)}{\left( x - t \right)^{z}} \, \operatorname{d}t$$

where $C^{m}\left( 0,\, \infty \right)$ and $m \in \mathbb{N}_{0} \wedge 0 < z < 1$.

A popular equivalent definition is:

$${^{\text{C}}\operatorname{D}_{x}^{\alpha}}\left[ f\left( x \right) \right] = \frac{1}{\Gamma\left( \left\lceil \alpha \right\rceil - \alpha \right)} \cdot \int\limits_{0}^{x} \frac{f^{\left( \left\lceil \alpha \right\rceil \right)}\left( t \right)}{\left( x - t \right)^{\alpha + 1 - \left\lceil \alpha \right\rceil}}\, \operatorname{d}t$$

where $\alpha \in \mathbb{R}_{> 0} \setminus \mathbb{N}$ and $\left\lceil \cdot \right\rceil$ is the ceiling function. This can be derived by substituting $\alpha = m + z$ so that $\left\lceil \alpha \right\rceil = m + 1$ would apply and $\left\lceil \alpha \right\rceil + z = \alpha + 1$ follows.

Another popular equivalent definition is given by:

$${^{\text{C}}\operatorname{D}_{x}^{\alpha}}\left[ f\left( x \right) \right] = \frac{1}{\Gamma\left( n - \alpha \right)} \cdot \int\limits_{0}^{x} \frac{f^{\left( n \right)}\left( t \right)}{\left( x - t \right)^{\alpha + 1 - n}}\, \operatorname{d}t$$

where $n - 1 < \alpha < n \in \mathbb{N}.$.

The problem with these definitions is that they only allow arguments in $\left( 0,\, \infty \right)$. This can be fixed by replacing the lower integral limit with $a$: ${_{a}^{\text{C}}\operatorname{D}_{x}^{\alpha}}\left[ f\left( x \right) \right] = \frac{1}{\Gamma\left( \left\lceil \alpha \right\rceil - \alpha \right)} \cdot \int\limits_{a}^{x} \frac{f^{\left( \left\lceil \alpha \right\rceil \right)}\left( t \right)}{\left( x - t \right)^{\alpha + 1 - \left\lceil \alpha \right\rceil}}\, \operatorname{d}t$. The new domain is $\left( a,\, \infty \right)$.

== Properties and theorems ==
=== Basic properties and theorems ===
A few basic properties are:

A table of basic properties and theorems
Properties	$f\left( x \right)$	${_{a}^{\text{C}}\operatorname{D}_{x}^{\alpha}}\left[ f\left( x \right) \right]$	Condition
Definition	$f\left( x \right)$	$f^{\left( \alpha \right)}\left( x \right) - f^{\left( \alpha \right)}\left( a \right)$	
Linearity	$b \cdot g\left( x \right) + c \cdot h\left( x \right)$	$b \cdot {_{a}^{\text{C}}\operatorname{D}_{x}^{\alpha}}\left[ g\left( x \right) \right] + c \cdot {_{a}^{\text{C}}\operatorname{D}_{x}^{\alpha}}\left[ h\left( x \right) \right]$	
Index law	$\operatorname{D}_{x}^{\beta}$	${_{a}^{\text{C}}\operatorname{D}_{x}^{\alpha + \beta}}$	$\beta \in \mathbb{Z}$
Semigroup property	${_{a}^{\text{C}}\operatorname{D}_{x}^{\beta}}$	${_{a}^{\text{C}}\operatorname{D}_{x}^{\alpha + \beta}}$	$\left\lceil \alpha \right\rceil = \left\lceil \beta \right\rceil$

==== Non-commutation ====
The index law does not always fulfill the property of commutation:

$$\operatorname{_{a}^{\text{C}}D}_{x}^{\alpha}\operatorname{_{a}^{\text{C}}D}_{x}^{\beta} = \operatorname{_{a}^{\text{C}}D}_{x}^{\alpha + \beta} \ne \operatorname{_{a}^{\text{C}}D}_{x}^{\beta}\operatorname{_{a}^{\text{C}}D}_{x}^{\alpha}$$

where $\alpha \in \mathbb{R}_{> 0} \setminus \mathbb{N} \wedge \beta \in \mathbb{N}$.

==== Fractional Leibniz rule ====
The Leibniz rule for the Caputo fractional derivative is given by:

$$\operatorname{_{a}^{\text{C}}D}_{x}^{\alpha}\left[ g\left( x \right) \cdot h\left( x \right) \right] = \sum\limits_{k = 0}^{\infty}\left[ \binom{a}{k} \cdot g^{\left( k \right)}\left( x \right) \cdot \operatorname{_{a}^{\text{RL}}D}_{x}^{\alpha - k}\left[ h\left( x \right) \right] \right] -  \frac{\left( x - a \right)^{-\alpha}}{\Gamma\left( 1 - \alpha \right)} \cdot g\left( a \right) \cdot h\left( a \right)$$

where $\binom{a}{b} = \frac{\Gamma\left( a + 1 \right)}{\Gamma\left( b + 1 \right) \cdot \Gamma\left( a - b + 1 \right)}$ is the binomial coefficient.

=== Relation to other fractional differential operators ===
Caputo-type fractional derivative is closely related to the Riemann–Liouville fractional integral via its definition:

$${_{a}^{\text{C}}\operatorname{D}_{x}^{\alpha}}\left[ f\left( x \right) \right] = {_{a}^{\text{RL}}\operatorname{I}_{x}^{\left\lceil \alpha \right\rceil - \alpha}}\left[ \operatorname{D}_{x}^{\left\lceil \alpha \right\rceil}\left[ f\left( x \right) \right] \right]$$

Furthermore, the following relation applies:

$${_{a}^{\text{C}}\operatorname{D}_{x}^{\alpha}}\left[ f\left( x \right) \right] = {_{a}^{\text{RL}}\operatorname{D}_{x}^{\alpha}}\left[ f\left( x \right) \right] - \sum\limits_{k = 0}^{\left\lfloor \alpha \right\rfloor}\left[ \frac{x^{k - \alpha}}{\Gamma\left( k - \alpha + 1 \right)} \cdot f^{\left( k \right)}\left( 0 \right) \right]$$

where ${_{a}^{\text{RL}}\operatorname{D}_{x}^{\alpha}}$ is the Riemann–Liouville fractional derivative.

=== Laplace transform ===
The Laplace transform of the Caputo-type fractional derivative is given by:

$$\mathcal{L}_{x}\left\{ {_{a}^{\text{C}}\operatorname{D}_{x}^{\alpha}}\left[ f\left( x \right) \right] \right\}\left( s \right) = s^{\alpha} \cdot F\left( s \right) - \sum\limits_{k = 0}^{\left\lceil \alpha \right\rceil - 1}\left[ s^{\alpha - k - 1} \cdot f^{\left( k \right)}\left( 0 \right) \right]$$

where $\mathcal{L}_{x}\left\{ f\left( x \right) \right\}\left( s \right) = F\left( s \right)$.

== Caputo fractional derivative of some functions ==
The Caputo fractional derivative of a constant $c$ is given by:

$$\begin{align}
{_{a}^{\text{C}}\operatorname{D}_{x}^{\alpha}}\left[ c \right] &= \frac{1}{\Gamma\left( \left\lceil \alpha \right\rceil - \alpha \right)} \cdot \int\limits_{a}^{x} \frac{\operatorname{D}_{t}^{\left\lceil \alpha \right\rceil}\left[ c \right]}{\left( x - t \right)^{\alpha + 1 - \left\lceil \alpha \right\rceil}}\, \operatorname{d}t = \frac{1}{\Gamma\left( \left\lceil \alpha \right\rceil - \alpha \right)} \cdot \int\limits_{a}^{x} \frac{0}{\left( x - t \right)^{\alpha + 1 - \left\lceil \alpha \right\rceil}}\, \operatorname{d}t\\
{_{a}^{\text{C}}\operatorname{D}_{x}^{\alpha}}\left[ c \right] &= 0
\end{align}$$

The Caputo fractional derivative of a power function $x^{b}$ is given by:

$$\begin{align}
{_{a}^{\text{C}}\operatorname{D}_{x}^{\alpha}}\left[ x^{b} \right] &= {_{a}^{\text{RL}}\operatorname{I}_{x}^{\left\lceil \alpha \right\rceil - \alpha}}\left[ \operatorname{D}_{x}^{\left\lceil \alpha \right\rceil}\left[ x^{b} \right] \right] = \frac{\Gamma\left( b + 1 \right)}{\Gamma\left( b - \left\lceil \alpha \right\rceil  + 1 \right)} \cdot {_{a}^{\text{RL}}\operatorname{I}_{x}^{\left\lceil \alpha \right\rceil - \alpha}}\left[ x^{b - \left\lceil \alpha \right\rceil} \right]\\ {_{a}^{\text{C}}\operatorname{D}_{x}^{\alpha}}\left[ x^{b} \right] &= \begin{cases} \frac{\Gamma\left( b + 1 \right)}{\Gamma\left( b - \alpha + 1 \right)} \left( x^{b - \alpha} - a^{b - \alpha} \right),\, &\text{for } \left\lceil \alpha \right\rceil - 1 < b \wedge b \in \mathbb{R}\\ 0,\, &\text{for } \left\lceil \alpha \right\rceil - 1 \geq b \wedge b \in \mathbb{N}\\ \end{cases}
\end{align}$$

The Caputo fractional derivative of an exponential function $e^{a \cdot x}$ is given by:

$$\begin{align}
{_{a}^{\text{C}}\operatorname{D}_{x}^{\alpha}}\left[ e^{b \cdot x} \right] &= {_{a}^{\text{RL}}\operatorname{I}_{x}^{\left\lceil \alpha \right\rceil - \alpha}}\left[ \operatorname{D}_{x}^{\left\lceil \alpha \right\rceil}\left[ e^{b \cdot x} \right] \right] = b^{\left\lceil \alpha \right\rceil} \cdot {_{a}^{\text{RL}}\operatorname{I}_{x}^{\left\lceil \alpha \right\rceil - \alpha}}\left[ e^{b \cdot x} \right]\\
{_{a}^{\text{C}}\operatorname{D}_{x}^{\alpha}}\left[ e^{b \cdot x} \right]  &= b^{\alpha} \cdot \left( E_{x}\left( \left\lceil \alpha \right\rceil - \alpha,\, b \right) - E_{a}\left( \left\lceil \alpha \right\rceil - \alpha,\, b \right) \right)\\
\end{align}$$

where $E_{x}\left( \nu,\, a \right) = \frac{a^{-\nu} \cdot e^{a \cdot x} \cdot \gamma\left( \nu,\, a \cdot x \right)}{\Gamma\left( \nu \right)}$ is the $\operatorname{E}_{t}$-function and $\gamma \left( a,\, b \right)$ is the lower incomplete gamma function.
