= Riesz potential =

Potential in mathematics

In mathematics, the Riesz potential is a potential named after its discoverer, the Hungarian mathematician Marcel Riesz. In a sense, the Riesz potential defines a fractional inverse power $(-\Delta)^{-\alpha/2}$ of the Laplace operator on Euclidean space. It generalizes to several variables the Riemann–Liouville integrals of one variable.

== Definition ==
If 0 < α < n, then the Riesz potential I_{α}f of a locally integrable function f on R^{n} is the function defined by

$(I_{\alpha}f) (x)= \frac{1}{c_\alpha} \int_{\R^n} \frac{f(y)}{| x - y |^{n-\alpha}} \, \mathrm{d}y$	1

where the constant is given by

$$c_\alpha = \pi^{n/2}2^\alpha\frac{\Gamma(\alpha/2)}{\Gamma((n-\alpha)/2)}.$$

This singular integral is well-defined provided f decays sufficiently rapidly at infinity, specifically if f ∈ L^{p}(R^{n}) with 1 ≤ p < n/α. The classical result due to Sobolev states that the rate of decay of f and that of I_{α}f are related in the form of an inequality (the Hardy–Littlewood–Sobolev inequality)

$$\|I_\alpha f\|_{p^*} \le C_p \|f\|_p, \quad p^*=\frac{np}{n-\alpha p}, \quad \forall 1 < p < \frac{n}{\alpha}$$

For p=1 the result was extended by (Schikorra, Spector & Van Schaftingen 2014),

$$\|I_\alpha f\|_{1^*} \le C_p \|Rf\|_1.$$

where $Rf=DI_1f$ is the vector-valued Riesz transform. More generally, the operators I_{α} are well-defined for complex α such that 0 < Re α < n.

The Riesz potential can be defined more generally in a weak sense as the convolution

$$I_\alpha f = f*K_\alpha$$

where K_{α} is the locally integrable function:

$$K_\alpha(x) = \frac{1}{c_\alpha}\frac{1}{|x|^{n-\alpha}}.$$

The Riesz potential can therefore be defined whenever f is a compactly supported distribution. In this connection, the Riesz potential of a positive Borel measure μ with compact support is chiefly of interest in potential theory because I_{α}μ is then a (continuous) subharmonic function off the support of μ, and is lower semicontinuous on all of R^{n}.

Consideration of the Fourier transform reveals that the Riesz potential is a Fourier multiplier. In fact, one has

$$\widehat{K_\alpha}(\xi) = \int_{\R^n} K_{\alpha}(x) e^{-2\pi i x \xi }\, \mathrm{d}x = |2\pi\xi|^{-\alpha}$$

and so, by the convolution theorem,

$$\widehat{I_\alpha f}(\xi) = |2\pi\xi|^{-\alpha} \hat{f}(\xi).$$

The Riesz potentials satisfy the following semigroup property on, for instance, rapidly decreasing continuous functions

$$I_\alpha I_\beta = I_{\alpha+\beta}$$

provided

$$0 < \operatorname{Re} \alpha, \operatorname{Re} \beta < n,\quad 0 < \operatorname{Re} (\alpha+\beta) < n.$$

Furthermore, if 0 < Re α < n–2, then

$$\Delta I_{\alpha+2} = I_{\alpha+2} \Delta=-I_\alpha.$$

One also has, for this class of functions,

$$\lim_{\alpha\to 0^+} (I_\alpha f)(x) = f(x).$$

== See also ==
- Bessel potential
- Fractional integration
- Sobolev space
