= Stokes's law of sound attenuation =

Formula for sound intensity loss in a Newtonian fluid

In acoustics, Stokes's law of sound attenuation is a formula for the attenuation of sound in a Newtonian fluid, such as water or air, due to the fluid's viscosity. It states that the amplitude of a plane wave decreases exponentially with distance traveled, at a rate α given by
$$\alpha = \frac{2 \eta\omega^2}{3\rho V^3}$$
where η is the dynamic viscosity coefficient of the fluid, ω is the sound's angular frequency, ρ is the fluid density, and V is the speed of sound in the medium.

The law and its derivation were published in 1845 by the Anglo-Irish physicist G. G. Stokes, who also developed Stokes's law for the friction force in fluid motion. A generalisation of Stokes attenuation taking into account the effect of thermal conductivity was proposed by the German physicist Gustav Kirchhoff in 1868.

Sound attenuation in fluids is also accompanied by acoustic dispersion, meaning that the different frequencies are propagating at different sound speeds.

== Interpretation ==
Stokes's law of sound attenuation applies to sound propagation in an isotropic and homogeneous Newtonian medium. Consider a plane sinusoidal pressure wave that has amplitude A_{0} at some point. After traveling a distance d from that point, its amplitude A(d) will be
$$A(d) = A_0e^{-\alpha d}$$

The parameter α is a kind of attenuation constant, dimensionally the reciprocal of length. In the International System of Units (SI), it is expressed in neper per meter or simply reciprocal of meter (m^{–1}). That is, if α = 1 m^{–1}, the wave's amplitude decreases by a factor of 1/e for each meter traveled.

== Importance of volume viscosity ==
The law is amended to include a contribution by the volume viscosity ζ:
$$\alpha = \frac{\left( 2\eta + \frac{3}{2}\zeta \right)\omega^2}{3\rho V^3} = \frac{\left( \frac{4}{3}\eta + \zeta \right)\omega^2}{2\rho V^3}$$
The volume viscosity coefficient is relevant when the fluid's compressibility cannot be ignored, such as in the case of ultrasound in water.The volume viscosity of water at 15 C is 3.09 centipoise.

== Modification for very high frequencies ==
Plot of reduced wave-vector and attenuation coefficient as functions of reduced frequency ωτ. (In the labels, ω_{c} = 1/τ) Reduced wave-vector, kcτ. Asymptotic regime at low and high frequencies. Attenuation coefficient, αcτ. Asymptotic regime at low and high frequencies (Stokes' law is the leftmost line).

Stokes's law is actually an asymptotic approximation for low frequencies of a more general formula involving relaxation time τ:
$$\begin{align}
2\left(\frac{\alpha V}{\omega}\right)^2 &= \frac{1}{\sqrt{1+\left(\omega\tau\right)^2}}-\frac{1}{1+\left(\omega\tau\right)^2}\\
\alpha &= \frac{\omega}{V}\sqrt{\frac{\sqrt{1+\left(\omega\tau\right)^2}-1}{2\left(1+\left(\omega\tau\right)^2\right)}}\\
\tau &= \frac{\frac{4\eta}{3} + \zeta}{\rho V^2} = \frac{4\eta+3\zeta}{3\rho V^2}\\
\alpha &= \omega \sqrt{\frac{3}{2}}\left(\frac{
\rho\left(\sqrt{\left(\omega\left(4\eta+3\zeta\right)\right)^2+\left(3\rho V^2\right)^2}-3\rho V^2\right)}{
\left(\omega\left(4\eta+3\zeta\right)\right)^2+\left(3\rho V^2\right)^2}
\right)^\frac{1}{2}\\
\end{align}$$
The relaxation time for water is about 2.0×10^{−12} seconds (2 picoseconds) per radian, corresponding to an angular frequency ω of 5×10^{11} radians (500 gigaradians) per second and therefore a frequency of about 3.14×10^{12} hertz (3.14 terahertz).

== See also ==
- Acoustic attenuation
