= Hermann Kober =

Jewish-German mathematician

Hermann Kober (born 1 February 1888 in Beuthen, Germany (now Bytom, Poland), died 4 October 1973 in Birmingham, England) was a Jewish-German mathematician who introduced Erdélyi–Kober operators. He taught (mathematics and science), up to the early 1960s, at some of the King Edward VI Foundation schools in Birmingham.
