= Acoustic attenuation =

Measure of energy loss as sound waves propagate through a medium

In acoustics, acoustic attenuation is a measure of the energy loss of sound propagation through an acoustic transmission medium. Most media have viscosity and are therefore not ideal media. When sound propagates in such media, there is always thermal consumption of energy caused by viscosity. This effect can be quantified through the Stokes's law of sound attenuation. Sound attenuation may also be a result of heat conductivity in the media as has been shown by G. Kirchhoff in 1868. The Stokes-Kirchhoff attenuation formula takes into account both viscosity and thermal conductivity effects.

For heterogeneous media, besides media viscosity, acoustic scattering is another main reason for removal of acoustic energy. Acoustic attenuation in a lossy medium plays an important role in many scientific researches and engineering fields, such as medical ultrasonography, vibration and noise reduction.

== Power-law frequency-dependent acoustic attenuation ==
Many experimental and field measurements show that the acoustic attenuation coefficient of a wide range of viscoelastic materials, such as soft tissue, polymers, soil, and porous rock, can be expressed as the following power law with respect to frequency:

$$P(x+\Delta x)=P(x)e^{-\alpha(\omega)\Delta x},\, \alpha(\omega)=\alpha_0\omega^\eta$$

where $P$ is the pressure, $x$ the position, $\Delta x$ the wave propagation distance, $\omega$ the angular frequency, $\alpha (\omega)$ the attenuation coefficient, and $\alpha_0$ and the frequency-dependent exponent $\eta$ are real, non-negative material parameters obtained by fitting experimental data; the value of $\eta$ ranges from 0 to 4. Acoustic attenuation in water is frequency-squared dependent, namely $\eta=2$. Acoustic attenuation in many metals and crystalline materials is frequency-independent, namely $\eta=1$. In contrast, it is widely noted that the $\eta$ of viscoelastic materials is between 0 and 2. For example, the exponent $\eta$ of sediment, soil, and rock is about 1, and the exponent $\eta$ of most soft tissues is between 1 and 2.

The classical dissipative acoustic wave propagation equations are confined to the frequency-independent and frequency-squared dependent attenuation, such as the damped wave equation and the approximate thermoviscous wave equation. In recent decades, increasing attention and efforts have been focused on developing accurate models to describe general power-law frequency-dependent acoustic attenuation. Most of these recent frequency-dependent models are established via the analysis of the complex wave number and are then extended to transient wave propagation. The multiple relaxation model considers the power law viscosity underlying different molecular relaxation processes. Szabo proposed a time convolution integral dissipative acoustic wave equation. On the other hand, acoustic wave equations based on fractional derivative viscoelastic models are applied to describe the power law frequency dependent acoustic attenuation. Chen and Holm proposed the positive fractional derivative modified Szabo's wave equation and the fractional Laplacian wave equation. See for a paper which compares fractional wave equations with model power-law attenuation. This book on power-law attenuation also covers the topic in more detail.

The phenomenon of attenuation obeying a frequency power-law may be described using a causal wave equation, derived from a fractional constitutive equation between stress and strain. This wave equation incorporates fractional time derivatives:

$${\nabla^2 u -\dfrac 1{c_0^2}\frac{\partial^2 u}{\partial t^2} + \tau_\sigma^\alpha \dfrac{\partial^\alpha}{\partial t^\alpha}\nabla^2 u	- \dfrac {\tau_\epsilon^\beta}{c_0^2} \dfrac{\partial^{\beta+2} u}{\partial t^{\beta+2}} = 0.}$$

See also and the references therein.

Such fractional derivative models are linked to the commonly recognized hypothesis that multiple relaxation phenomena (see Nachman et al.) give rise to the attenuation measured in complex media. This link is further described in and in the survey paper.

For frequency band-limited waves, Ref. describes a model-based method to attain causal power-law attenuation using a set of discrete relaxation mechanisms within the Nachman et al. framework.

In porous fluid-saturated sedimentary rocks, such as sandstone, acoustic attenuation is primarily caused by the wave-induced flow of the pore fluid relative to the solid frame, with $\eta$ varying between 0.5 and 1.5.

== See also ==
- Absorption (acoustics)
- Fractional calculus
