= Nonlocal Lagrangian =

Lagrangians with nonlocal physics

In field theory, a nonlocal Lagrangian is a Lagrangian, a type of functional $\mathcal{L}[\phi(x)]$ containing terms that are nonlocal in the fields $\phi(x)$, i.e. not polynomials or functions of the fields or their derivatives evaluated at a single point in the space of dynamical parameters (e.g. space-time). Examples of such nonlocal Lagrangians might be:

- $\mathcal{L} = \frac{1}{2}\big(\partial_x \phi(x)\big)^2 - \frac{1}{2}m^2 \phi(x)^2 + \phi(x) \int \frac{\phi(y)}{(x - y)^2} \,d^ny.$
- $\mathcal{L} = -\frac{1}{4}\mathcal{F}_{\mu\nu}\left(1 + \frac{m^2}{\partial^2}\right)\mathcal{F}^{\mu\nu}.$
- $S = \int dt \,d^dx \left[\psi^*\left(i\hbar \frac{\partial}{\partial t} + \mu\right)\psi - \frac{\hbar^2}{2m}\nabla \psi^*\cdot \nabla \psi\right] - \frac{1}{2}\int dt \,d^dx \,d^dy \, V(\mathbf{y} - \mathbf{x}) \psi^*(\mathbf{x}) \psi(\mathbf{x}) \psi^*(\mathbf{y}) \psi(\mathbf{y}).$
- The Wess–Zumino–Witten action.

Actions obtained from nonlocal Lagrangians are called nonlocal actions. The actions appearing in the fundamental theories of physics, such as the Standard Model, are local actions; nonlocal actions play a part in theories that attempt to go beyond the Standard Model and also in some effective field theories. Nonlocalization of a local action is also an essential aspect of some regularization procedures. Noncommutative quantum field theory also gives rise to nonlocal actions.
