= Grünwald–Letnikov derivative =

Derivative in fractional calculus

In mathematics, the Grünwald–Letnikov derivative is a basic extension of the derivative in fractional calculus that allows one to take the derivative a non-integer number of times. It was introduced by Anton Karl Grünwald (1838–1920) from Prague, in 1867, and by Aleksey Vasilievich Letnikov (1837–1888) in Moscow in 1868.

== Constructing the Grünwald–Letnikov derivative ==
The formula

$$f'(x) = \lim_{h \to 0} \frac{f(x+h)-f(x)}{h}$$

for the derivative can be applied recursively to get higher-order derivatives. For example, the second-order derivative would be:

$$\begin{align}f''(x)&=\lim_{h\to0}\frac{f'(x+h)-f'(x)}{h}\\&=\lim_{h_1\to0}\frac{\lim\limits_{h_2\to0}\dfrac{f(x+h_1+h_2)-f(x+h_1)}{h_2}-\lim\limits_{h_2\to0} \dfrac{f(x+h_2)-f(x)}{h_2}}{h_1}\end{align}$$

Assuming that the h 's converge synchronously, this simplifies to:

$$= \lim_{h \to 0} \frac{f(x+2h)-2f(x+h)+f(x)}{h^2}$$

which can be justified rigorously by the mean value theorem. In general, we have (see binomial coefficient):

$$f^{(n)}(x) = \lim_{h \to 0} \frac{\sum\limits_{0\le m\le n}(-1)^m {n \choose m}f(x+(n-m)h)}{h^n}$$

Removing the restriction that n be a positive integer, it is reasonable to define:

$$\mathbb{D}^q f(x) = \lim_{h \to 0} \frac{1}{h^q}\sum_{0 \le m < \infty}(-1)^m {q \choose m}f(x+(q-m)h).$$

This defines the Grünwald–Letnikov derivative.

To simplify notation, we set:

$$\Delta^q_h f(x) = \sum_{0 \le m < \infty}(-1)^m {q \choose m}f(x+(q-m)h).$$

Then the Grünwald–Letnikov derivative may be succinctly written as:

$$\mathbb{D}^q f(x) =  \lim_{h \to 0}\frac{\Delta^q_h f(x)}{h^q}.$$

=== An alternative definition ===
In the preceding section, the general first principles equation for integer order derivatives was derived. It can be shown that the equation may also be written as

$$f^{(n)}(x) = \lim_{h \to 0} \frac{(-1)^n}{h^n}\sum_{0 \le m \le n}(-1)^m {n \choose m}f(x+mh).$$

or removing the restriction that n must be a positive integer:

$$\mathbb{D}^q f(x) = \lim_{h \to 0} \frac{(-1)^q}{h^q}\sum_{0 \le m < \infty}(-1)^m {q \choose m}f(x+mh).$$

This equation is called the reverse Grünwald–Letnikov derivative. If the substitution h → −h is made, the resulting equation is called the direct Grünwald–Letnikov derivative:

$$\mathbb{D}^q f(x) = \lim_{h \to 0} \frac{1}{h^q}\sum_{0 \le m < \infty}(-1)^m {q \choose m}f(x-mh).$$
