= Weyl integral =

In mathematics, the Weyl integral (named after Hermann Weyl) is an operator defined, as an example of fractional calculus, on functions f on the unit circle having integral 0 and a Fourier series. In other words there is a Fourier series for f of the form

$$\sum_{n=-\infty}^{\infty} a_n e^{in \theta}$$

with a_{0} = 0.

Then the Weyl integral operator of order s is defined on Fourier series by

$$\sum_{n=-\infty}^{\infty} (in)^s a_n e^{in\theta}$$

where this is defined. Here s can take any real value, and for integer values k of s the series expansion is the expected k-th derivative, if k > 0, or (−k)th indefinite integral normalized by integration from θ = 0.

The condition a_{0} = 0 here plays the obvious role of excluding the need to consider division by zero. The definition is due to Hermann Weyl (1917).

== See also ==
- Sobolev space
