= Fractional calculus =

Branch of mathematical analysis

In mathematics, fractional calculus is the branch of analysis that studies the several different possibilities of defining real number powers or complex number powers of the differentiation operator
$$D f(x) = \frac{d}{dx} f(x)$$
and of the integration operator (Note: The letter $J$ is commonly used instead of $I$ in order to avoid confusion with other concepts identified by similar $I$–like symbols, such as identity functions.)
$$J f(x) = \int_0^x f(s) \,ds,$$
and developing a calculus for such operators generalizing the classical one.

In this context, the term powers refers to iterative application of a linear operator $D$ to a function $f$, that is, repeatedly composing $D$ with itself, as in
$$D^n(f) = (\underbrace{D\circ D\circ D\circ\cdots \circ D}_n)(f) = \underbrace{D(D(D(\cdots D}_n (f)\cdots))).$$

For example, one may ask for a meaningful interpretation of $\sqrt{D} = D^{\frac12}$ as an analogue of the functional square root for the differentiation operator, that is, an expression for some linear operator that, when applied twice to any function, will have the same effect as differentiation. More generally, one can look at the question of defining a linear operator $D^a$ for every real number $a$ in such a way that, when $a$ takes an integer value $n\in\Z$, it coincides with the usual $n$-fold differentiation $D$ if $n>0$, and with the $n$-th power of $J$ when $n<0$.

One of the motivations behind the introduction and study of these sorts of extensions of the differentiation operator $D$ is that the sets of operator powers $\{D^a\mid a\in\R\}$ defined in this way are continuous semigroups with parameter $a$, of which the original semigroup of $\{D^n\mid n\in\Z\}$ for integer $n$ is a countable discrete subgroup; since continuous semigroups have a well-developed mathematical theory, they can be applied to the study of fractional calculus here.

Fractional differential equations, also known as extraordinary differential equations, are a generalization of differential equations through the application of fractional calculus.

== Historical notes ==
In applied mathematics and mathematical analysis, a fractional derivative is a derivative of any arbitrary order, real or complex. Its first appearance is in a letter written to Guillaume de l'Hôpital by Gottfried Wilhelm Leibniz in 1695. Around the same time, Leibniz wrote to Johann Bernoulli about derivatives of "general order". In the correspondence between Leibniz and John Wallis in 1697, Wallis's infinite product for $\pi/2$ is discussed. Leibniz suggested using differential calculus to achieve this result. Leibniz further used the notation ${d}^{1/2}{y}$ to denote the derivative of order $\textstyle\frac{1}{2}$.

Fractional calculus was introduced in one of Niels Henrik Abel's early papers where all the elements can be found: the idea of fractional-order integration and differentiation, the mutually inverse relationship between them, the understanding that fractional-order differentiation and integration can be considered as the same generalized operation, and the unified notation for differentiation and integration of arbitrary real order. Independently, the foundations of the subject were laid by Liouville in a paper from 1832. Oliver Heaviside introduced the practical use of fractional differential operators in electrical transmission line analysis circa 1890. The theory and applications of fractional calculus expanded greatly over the 19th and 20th centuries, and numerous contributors have given different definitions for fractional derivatives and integrals.

== Computing the fractional integral ==
Let $f(x)$ be a function defined for $x>0$. Form the definite integral from 0 to $x$. Call this
$$( J f ) ( x ) = \int_0^x f(t) \, dt \,.$$

Repeating this process gives
$$\left( J^2 f \right) (x) = \int_0^x (Jf)(t) \,dt = \int_0^x \bigg(\int_0^t f(s) \,ds \bigg) dt,$$

and this can be extended arbitrarily.

The Cauchy formula for repeated integration, namely
$$\left(J^n f\right) ( x ) = \frac{1}{ (n-1) ! } \int_0^x \left(x-t\right)^{n-1} f(t) \, dt,$$
leads in a straightforward way to a generalization for real powers: using the gamma function instead of the factorial function gives us a natural candidate for applications of the fractional integral operator as
$$\left(J^\alpha f\right) ( x ) = \frac{1}{ \Gamma ( \alpha ) } \int_0^x \left(x-t\right)^{\alpha-1} f(t) \, dt.$$

This is in fact a well-defined operator.

It is straightforward to show that the J operator satisfies
$$\begin{align}
\left(J^\alpha\right) \left(J^\beta f\right)(x) &= \left(J^\beta\right) \left(J^\alpha f\right)(x) \\
&= \left(J^{\alpha+\beta} f\right)(x) \\
&= \frac{1}{ \Gamma ( \alpha + \beta) } \int_0^x \left(x-t\right)^{\alpha+\beta-1} f(t) \, dt \,.
\end{align}$$

Proof of this identity

$$\begin{align}
\left(J^\alpha\right) \left(J^\beta f\right)(x) & = \frac{1}{\Gamma(\alpha)} \int_0^x (x-t)^{\alpha-1} \left(J^\beta f\right)(t) \, dt \\
& = \frac{1}{\Gamma(\alpha) \Gamma(\beta)} \int_0^x \int_0^t \left(x-t\right)^{\alpha-1} \left(t-s\right)^{\beta-1} f(s) \, ds \, dt \\
& = \frac{1}{\Gamma(\alpha) \Gamma(\beta)} \int_0^x f(s) \left( \int_s^x \left(x-t\right)^{\alpha-1} \left(t-s\right)^{\beta-1} \, dt \right) \, ds
\end{align}$$

where in the last step we exchanged the order of integration and pulled out the f(s) factor from the t integration.

Changing variables to r defined by t = s + (x − s)r,
$$\left(J^\alpha\right) \left(J^\beta f\right)(x) = \frac{1}{\Gamma(\alpha) \Gamma(\beta)} \int_0^x \left(x-s\right)^{\alpha + \beta - 1} f(s) \left( \int_0^1 \left(1-r\right)^{\alpha-1} r^{\beta-1} \, dr \right)\, ds$$

The inner integral is the beta function which satisfies the following property:
$$\int_0^1 \left(1-r\right)^{\alpha-1} r^{\beta-1} \, dr = B(\alpha, \beta) = \frac{\Gamma(\alpha)\,\Gamma(\beta)}{\Gamma(\alpha+\beta)}$$

Substituting back into the equation:
$$\begin{align}
\left(J^\alpha\right) \left(J^\beta f\right)(x) &= \frac{1}{\Gamma(\alpha + \beta)} \int_0^x \left(x-s\right)^{\alpha + \beta - 1} f(s) \, ds \\
&= \left(J^{\alpha + \beta} f\right)(x)
\end{align}$$

Interchanging α and β shows that the order in which the J operator is applied is irrelevant and completes the proof.

This relationship is called the semigroup property of fractional differintegral operators.

=== Riemann–Liouville fractional integral ===
The classical form of fractional calculus is given by the Riemann–Liouville integral, which is essentially what has been described above. The theory of fractional integration for periodic functions (therefore including the "boundary condition" of repeating after a period) is given by the Weyl integral. It is defined on Fourier series, and requires the constant Fourier coefficient to vanish (thus, it applies to functions on the unit circle whose integrals evaluate to zero). The Riemann–Liouville integral exists in two forms, upper and lower. Over an interval $[a,b]$, the integrals are defined as
$$\begin{align}
{}_aD_t^{-\alpha} f(t) &= {}_aI_t^\alpha f(t) =\frac{1}{\Gamma(\alpha)}\int_a^t \left(t-\tau\right)^{\alpha-1} f(\tau) \, d\tau, \\[4pt]
{}_tD_b^{-\alpha} f(t) &= {}_tI_b^\alpha f(t) =\frac{1}{\Gamma(\alpha)}\int_t^b \left(\tau-t\right)^{\alpha-1} f(\tau) \, d\tau,
\end{align}$$

where the former is valid for $t > a$ and the latter is valid for $t < b$.

It has been suggested that the integral on the positive real axis (i.e. $a = 0$) would be more appropriately named the Abel–Riemann integral, on the basis of history of discovery and use, and in the same vein the integral over the entire real line be named Liouville–Weyl integral.

Conversely, the Grünwald–Letnikov derivative starts with the derivative instead of the integral.

=== Hadamard fractional integral ===
The Hadamard fractional integral was introduced by Jacques Hadamard and is given by the following formula,
$${}_a\mathbf{D}_t^{-\alpha} f(t) = \frac{1}{\Gamma(\alpha)} \int_a^t \left(\log\frac{t}{\tau} \right)^{\alpha -1} f(\tau)\frac{d\tau}{\tau}, \qquad t > a\,.$$

=== Atangana–Baleanu fractional integral ===
The Atangana–Baleanu fractional integral of a continuous function is defined as
$$\sideset{_{\hphantom{A}a}^\operatorname{AB}}{_t^\alpha}I f(t)=\frac{1-\alpha}{\operatorname{AB}(\alpha)}f(t)+\frac{\alpha}{\operatorname{AB}(\alpha)\Gamma(\alpha)}\int_a^t \left(t-\tau\right)^{\alpha-1} f(\tau) \, d\tau.$$

== Fractional derivatives ==
Unfortunately, the comparable process for the derivative operator D is significantly more complicated, but it can be shown that D is neither commutative nor additive in general.

Unlike classical Newtonian derivatives, fractional derivatives can be defined in a variety of different ways that often do not all lead to the same result even for smooth functions. Some of these are defined via a fractional integral. Because of the incompatibility of definitions, it is frequently necessary to be explicit about which definition is used.

Fractional derivatives of a Gaussian, interpolating continuously between the function and its first derivative

=== Riemann–Liouville fractional derivative ===
The corresponding derivative is calculated using Lagrange's rule for differential operators. To find the αth order derivative, the nth order derivative of the integral of order (n − α) is computed, where n is the smallest integer greater than α (that is, n = ⌈α⌉). The Riemann–Liouville fractional derivative and integral has multiple applications, such as in case of solutions to the equation in the case of multiple systems such as the tokamak systems, and variable order fractional parameter. Similar to the definitions for the Riemann–Liouville integral, the derivative has upper and lower variants.
$$\begin{align}
\sideset{_a}{_t^\alpha}D f(t) &= \frac{d^n}{dt^n} \sideset{_a}{_t^{-(n-\alpha)}}Df(t) \\
&= \frac{d^n}{dt^n} \sideset{_a}{_t^{n-\alpha}}I f(t) \\
\sideset{_t}{_b^\alpha}D f(t) &= \frac{d^n}{dt^n} \sideset{_t}{_b^{-(n-\alpha)}}Df(t) \\
&= \frac{d^n}{dt^n} \sideset{_t}{_b^{n-\alpha}}I f(t)
\end{align}$$

=== Caputo fractional derivative ===
Another option for computing fractional derivatives is the Caputo fractional derivative. It was introduced by Michele Caputo in his 1967 paper. In contrast to the Riemann–Liouville fractional derivative, when solving differential equations using Caputo's definition, it is not necessary to define the fractional order initial conditions. Caputo's definition is illustrated as follows, where again n = ⌈α⌉:
$$\sideset{^C}{_t^\alpha}D f(t)=\frac{1}{\Gamma(n-\alpha)} \int_0^t \frac{f^{(n)}(\tau)}{\left(t-\tau\right)^{\alpha+1-n}}\, d\tau.$$

There is the Caputo fractional derivative defined as:
$$D^\nu f(t)=\frac{1}{\Gamma(n-\nu)} \int_0^t (t-u)^{(n-\nu-1)}f^{(n)}(u)\, du \qquad (n-1)<\nu<n$$
which has the advantage that it is zero when f(t) is constant and its Laplace Transform is expressed by means of the initial values of the function and its derivative. Moreover, there is the Caputo fractional derivative of distributed order defined as
$$\begin{align}
\sideset{_a^b}{^nu}Df(t) &= \int_a^b \phi(\nu)\left[D^{(\nu)}f(t)\right]\,d\nu \\
&= \int_a^b\left[\frac{\phi(\nu)}{\Gamma(1-\nu)}\int_0^t \left(t-u\right)^{-\nu}f'(u)\,du \right]\,d\nu
\end{align}$$

where ϕ(ν) is a weight function and which is used to represent mathematically the presence of multiple memory formalisms.

=== Caputo–Fabrizio fractional derivative ===
In a paper of 2015, M. Caputo and M. Fabrizio presented a definition of fractional derivative with a non singular kernel, for a function $f(t)$ of $C^1$ given by:
$$\sideset{_{\hphantom{C}a}^\text{CF}}{_t^\alpha}Df(t)=\frac{1}{1-\alpha} \int_a^t f'(\tau) \ e^\left(-\alpha\frac{t-\tau}{1-\alpha}\right) \ d\tau,$$

where $a < 0, \alpha \in (0,1]$.

=== Atangana–Baleanu fractional derivative ===
In 2016, Atangana and Baleanu suggested differential operators based on the generalized Mittag-Leffler function $E_{\alpha}$. The aim was to introduce fractional differential operators with non-singular nonlocal kernel. Their fractional differential operators are given below in Riemann–Liouville sense and Caputo sense respectively. For a function $f(t)$ of $C^1$ given by
$$\sideset{_{\hphantom{AB}a}^{\text{ABC}}}{_t^\alpha}D f(t)=\frac{\operatorname{AB}(\alpha)}{1-\alpha} \int_a^t f'(\tau)E_{\alpha}\left(-\alpha\frac{(t-\tau)^{\alpha}}{1-\alpha}\right)d\tau,$$

If the function is continuous, the Atangana–Baleanu derivative in Riemann–Liouville sense is given by:
$$\sideset{_{\hphantom{AB}a}^{\text{ABC}}}{_t^\alpha}D f(t)=\frac{\operatorname{AB}(\alpha)}{1-\alpha} \frac{d}{dt}\int_a^t f(\tau)E_{\alpha}\left(-\alpha\frac{(t-\tau)^{\alpha}}{1-\alpha}\right)d\tau,$$

The kernel used in Atangana–Baleanu fractional derivative has some properties of a cumulative distribution function. For example, for all $\alpha \in (0, 1]$, the function $E_\alpha$ is increasing on the real line, converges to $0$ in $- \infty$, and $E_\alpha (0) = 1$. Therefore, we have that, the function $x \mapsto 1-E_\alpha (-x^\alpha)$ is the cumulative distribution function of a probability measure on the positive real numbers. The distribution is therefore defined, and any of its multiples is called a Mittag-Leffler distribution of order $\alpha$. It is also well-known that all these probability distributions are absolutely continuous. In particular, the Mittag-Leffler function has a particular case $E_1$, which is the exponential function, the Mittag-Leffler distribution of order $1$ is therefore an exponential distribution. However, for $\alpha \in (0, 1)$, the Mittag-Leffler distributions are heavy-tailed. Their Laplace transform is given by:
$$\mathbb{E} (e^{- \lambda X_\alpha}) = \frac{1}{1+\lambda^\alpha},$$

This directly implies that, for $\alpha \in (0, 1)$, the expectation is infinite. In addition, these distributions are geometric stable distributions.

=== Riesz derivative ===
The Riesz derivative is defined as
$$\mathcal{F} \left\{ \frac{\partial^\alpha u}{\partial \left|x\right|^\alpha} \right\}(k) = -\left|k\right|^{\alpha} \mathcal{F} \{u \}(k),$$

where $\mathcal{F}$ denotes the Fourier transform.

=== Conformable fractional derivative ===
The conformable fractional derivative of a function $f$ of order $\alpha$ is given by
$$T_\alpha(f)(t) = \lim_{\epsilon \rightarrow 0}\frac{f\left(t+\epsilon t^{1-\alpha}\right) - f(t)}{\epsilon}$$
Unlike other definitions of the fractional derivative, the conformable fractional derivative obeys the product and quotient rule and has analogs to Rolle's theorem and the mean value theorem. However, this fractional derivative produces significantly different results compared to the Riemann-Liouville and Caputo fractional derivative. In 2020, Feng Gao and Chunmei Chi defined the improved Caputo-type conformable fractional derivative, which more closely approximates the behavior of the Caputo fractional derivative:
$$^C_a\widetilde{T}_\alpha(f)(t) = \lim_{\epsilon \rightarrow 0}\left[(1-\alpha)(f(t)-f(a))+\alpha\frac{f\left(t+\epsilon (t-a)^{1-\alpha}\right) - f(t)}{\epsilon}\right]$$
where $a$ and $t$ are real numbers and $a<t$. They also defined the improved Riemann-Liouville-type conformable fractional derivative to similarly approximate the Riemann-Liouville fractional derivative:

$$^{RL}_a\widetilde{T}_\alpha(f)(t) = \lim_{\epsilon \rightarrow 0}\left[(1-\alpha)f(t)+\alpha\frac{f\left(t+\epsilon (t-a)^{1-\alpha}\right) - f(t)}{\epsilon}\right]$$
where $a$ and $t$ are real numbers and $a<t$. Both improved conformable fractional derivatives have analogs to Rolle's theorem and the interior extremum theorem.

=== Other types ===
Classical fractional derivatives include:

- Grünwald–Letnikov derivative
- Sonin–Letnikov derivative
- Liouville derivative
- Caputo derivative
- Hadamard derivative
- Marchaud derivative
- Riesz derivative
- Miller–Ross derivative
- Weyl derivative
- Erdélyi–Kober derivative
- $F^{\alpha}$-derivative

New fractional derivatives include:

- Coimbra derivative
- Katugampola derivative
- Hilfer derivative
- Davidson derivative
- Chen derivative
- Caputo-Fabrizio derivative
- Atangana–Baleanu derivative

Novel fractional derivatives with nonsingular kernels, namely the Caputo-Fabrizio and Atangana–Baleanu derivatives, are subject to controversy in applied mathematics literature. Criticism is leveled against the validity and applications of these derivatives, with critics arguing these derivatives to be simple realizations of either integer derivatives or standard Caputo fractional derivatives, or incompatible with the fundamental theorem of fractional calculus.

On the other hand, subsequent work has argued that the claim that fractional derivatives with continuous (non-singular) kernels are too restrictive is a consequence of initializing fractional differential equations using single-time values instead of past histories. Since memory is an intrinsic property of fractional models, such initialization is physically and mathematically inconsistent. When the model past is treated correctly, the alleged incompatibilities of nonsingular kernels no longer arise. The paper concludes that the limitations attributed to operators such as the Caputo–Fabrizio and Atangana–Baleanu derivatives stem from modeling assumptions, not from the operators.

In applied settings, fractional operators with non-singular kernels have demonstrated utility in modeling complex physical systems. For instance, a study on anomalous diffusion in electrolytic cells found that models incorporating derivatives based on the Mittag-Leffler function a class of non-singular kernels provided a superior fit to experimental impedance spectroscopy data compared to models using the classical singular Caputo derivative. This result highlights the practical value of these operators for capturing memory effects and anomalous transport in real-world materials. Based on the 2017 study by Tateishi, Ribeiro, and Lenzi, fractional operators with non-singular kernels provide distinct mechanisms for modeling anomalous diffusion. The Atangana–Baleanu–Caputo (ABC) operator, with its Mittag-Leffler kernel, yields a crossover from usual to sub-diffusive dynamics, matching patterns observed in complex systems like biological cells. In contrast, the Caputo–Fabrizio (CF) operator, with an exponential kernel, leads to a different crossover from diffusion to a confined stationary state, which is mathematically equivalent to a diffusion process with stochastic resetting.

To reply to the criticism regarding the mathematical definition of their operator, Caputo and Fabrizio have argued that when their derivative is correctly defined over an interval [a,t) that accounts for the system's pre-history, it can be represented in an equivalent form that includes a singular kernel and is capable of modeling complex material behaviors like viscoplasticity.

=== Relation with the Caputo derivative ===
The Atangana–Baleanu fractional derivative in the Caputo sense (ABC) is structurally different from the classical Caputo fractional derivative. In particular, the ABC operator can be written as a convolution of the Caputo derivative with a nontrivial Mittag–Leffler kernel, which shows that it is not a simple rescaling of the Caputo operator.

For $0<\alpha<1$ and $f(0)= 0$, the Laplace transform of the Caputo derivative is $\mathcal{L}\{{}^{C}D^{\alpha}f(t)\}(s)=s^{\alpha}F(s),$ where $F(s)=\mathcal{L}\{f(t)\}(s)$. The ABC derivative satisfies $\mathcal{L}\{{}^{ABC}D^{\alpha}f(t)\}(s) = \frac{1}{1-\alpha}\frac{s^{\alpha}}{s^{\alpha}+\lambda}F(s), \qquad \lambda=\frac{\alpha}{1-\alpha}.$

Hence, $\mathcal{L}\{{}^{ABC}D^{\alpha}f(t)\}(s) = \frac{1}{1-\alpha}\frac{1}{s^{\alpha}+\lambda} \mathcal{L}\{{}^{C}D^{\alpha}f(t)\}(s).$

By inversion, the ABC derivative admits the convolution form ${}^{ABC}D^{\alpha}f(t) = \int_0^t k(t-\tau)\,{}^{C}D^{\alpha}f(\tau)\,d\tau,$ with kernel $k(t) = \frac{1}{1-\alpha}\,t^{\alpha-1}E_{\alpha{,}\alpha}(-\lambda t^{\alpha}),$ where $E_{\alpha{,}\beta}$ denotes the two-parameter Mittag–Leffler function.

Since the kernel is not a Dirac delta distribution, the ABC operator is not a scalar multiple of the Caputo operator.

== Comparison of eigenfunction properties ==
=== Caputo derivative ===
For $0<\alpha<1$ and $\mu \in \mathbb{C}$, the Caputo fractional derivative is defined by

$${}_0^C D_t^\alpha f(t)
=
\frac{1}{\Gamma(1-\alpha)}
\int_0^t (t-\tau)^{-\alpha} f'(\tau)\, d\tau .$$

The one-parameter Mittag-Leffler function

$$E_\alpha(z)
=
\sum_{k=0}^{\infty}
\frac{z^k}{\Gamma(\alpha k+1)},
\qquad z \in \mathbb{C},$$

satisfies the eigenfunction equation

$${}_0^C D_t^\alpha E_\alpha(\mu t^\alpha)
=
\mu\, E_\alpha(\mu t^\alpha).$$

=== Atangana–Baleanu derivative (Caputo sense) ===
With the choice $B(\alpha)=1$ for the normalisation constant, the Atangana–Baleanu derivative in the Caputo sense (ABC derivative) is defined by

$${}_0^{ABC} D_t^\alpha f(t)
=
\frac{1}{1-\alpha}
\int_0^t
E_\alpha\!\bigl(-\lambda (t-\tau)^\alpha\bigr)
f'(\tau)\, d\tau,
\qquad
\lambda = \frac{\alpha}{1-\alpha},
\quad 0<\alpha<1 .$$

Its Laplace transform is

$$\mathcal{L}
\left[
{}_0^{ABC} D_t^\alpha f(t)
\right](s)
=
\frac{1}{1-\alpha}
\frac{s^\alpha}{s^\alpha+\lambda}
\bigl( sF(s) - f(0) \bigr),$$

where $F(s)=\mathcal{L}\{f(t)\}(s)$.

Applying this operator to $f(t)=E_\alpha(\mu t^\alpha)$ gives

$$F(s)
=
\frac{s^{\alpha-1}}{s^\alpha-\mu},
\qquad
f(0)=1,$$

and therefore

$$\mathcal{L}
\left[
{}_0^{ABC} D_t^\alpha E_\alpha(\mu t^\alpha)
\right](s)
=
\frac{1}{1-\alpha}
\frac{s^\alpha}{s^\alpha+\lambda}
\left(
\frac{s^\alpha}{s^\alpha-\mu}-1
\right)
=
\frac{1}{1-\alpha}
\frac{\mu s^\alpha}{(s^\alpha-\mu)(s^\alpha+\lambda)}.$$

Partial fraction decomposition in the variable $s^\alpha$ yields

$$\frac{s^\alpha}{(s^\alpha-\mu)(s^\alpha+\lambda)}
=
\frac{\mu}{\mu+\lambda}\frac{1}{s^\alpha-\mu}
+
\frac{\lambda}{\mu+\lambda}\frac{1}{s^\alpha+\lambda}.$$

Hence,

$$\mathcal{L}
\left[
{}_0^{ABC} D_t^\alpha E_\alpha(\mu t^\alpha)
\right](s)
=
\frac{\mu}{1-\alpha}
\left(
\frac{\mu}{\mu+\lambda}\frac{1}{s^\alpha-\mu}
+
\frac{\lambda}{\mu+\lambda}\frac{1}{s^\alpha+\lambda}
\right).$$

Using the inverse Laplace transform identity

$$\mathcal{L}^{-1}
\left\{
\frac{1}{s^\alpha-a}
\right\}
=
t^{\alpha-1} E_{\alpha,\alpha}(a t^\alpha),$$

where the two-parameter Mittag-Leffler function is defined by

$$E_{\alpha,\beta}(z)
=
\sum_{k=0}^{\infty}
\frac{z^k}{\Gamma(\alpha k+\beta)},$$

one obtains the exact time-domain expression

$${}_0^{ABC} D_t^\alpha E_\alpha(\mu t^\alpha)
=
\frac{\mu}{1-\alpha}
\left(
\frac{\mu}{\mu+\lambda}
\, t^{\alpha-1} E_{\alpha,\alpha}(\mu t^\alpha)
+
\frac{\lambda}{\mu+\lambda}
\, t^{\alpha-1} E_{\alpha,\alpha}(-\lambda t^\alpha)
\right).$$

=== Consequence ===
The resulting expression is not proportional to $E_\alpha(\mu t^\alpha)$. Therefore, unlike the Caputo derivative, the ABC derivative does not admit the one-parameter Mittag-Leffler function as an eigenfunction.

Consequently, except in the limiting cases $\alpha \to 0$ or $\alpha \to 1$, the ABC derivative cannot be expressed as a scalar multiple (depending only on $\alpha$) of the Caputo derivative.

==== Coimbra derivative ====
The Coimbra derivative is used for physical modeling: A number of applications in both mechanics and optics can be found in the works by Coimbra and collaborators, as well as additional applications to physical problems and numerical implementations studied in a number of works by other authors

For $q(t) < 1$
$$\begin{align}
^{\mathbb{C}}_{ a}\mathbb{D}^{q(t)} f(t)=\frac{1}{\Gamma[1-q(t)]}  \int_{0^+}^t (t-\tau)^{-q(t)}\frac{d\,f(\tau)}{d\tau}d\tau\,+\,\frac{(f(0^+)-f(0^-))\,t^{-q(t)}}{\Gamma(1-q(t))},
\end{align}$$
where the lower limit $a$ can be taken as either $0^-$ or $-\infty$ as long as $f(t)$ is identically zero from or $-\infty$ to $0^-$. Note that this operator returns the correct fractional derivatives for all values of $t$ and can be applied to either the dependent function itself $f(t)$ with a variable order of the form $q(f(t))$ or to the independent variable with a variable order of the form $q(t)$.$^{[1]}$

The Coimbra derivative can be generalized to any order, leading to the Coimbra Generalized Order Differintegration Operator (GODO) For $q(t) < m$
$$\begin{align}
^{\mathbb{\quad C}}_{\,\,-\infty}\mathbb{D}^{q(t)} f(t)=\frac{1}{\Gamma[
m-q(t)]}  \int_{0^+}^t (t-\tau)^{m-1-q(t)}\frac{d^m f(\tau)}{d\tau^m}d\tau\,+\,\sum^{m-1}_{n = 0} \frac{(\frac{d^n f(t)}{dt^n }|_{0^+}-\frac{d^n f(t)}{dt^n}|_{0^-})\,t^{n -q(t)}}{\Gamma[n+1-q(t)]},
\end{align}$$
where $m$ is an integer larger than the larger value of $q(t)$ for all values of $t$. Note that the second (summation) term on the right side of the definition above can be expressed as

$$\begin{align}
\frac{1}{\Gamma[m-q(t)]}\sum^{m-1}_{n = 0} \{[\frac{d^n\!f(t)}{dt^n}|_{0^+}-\frac{d^n\!f(t)}{dt^n }|_{0^-}]\,t^{n -q(t)} \prod^{m-1}_{j=n+1} [j- q(t)]\}
\end{align}$$
so to keep the denominator on the positive branch of the Gamma ($\Gamma$) function and for ease of numerical calculation.

=== Nature of the fractional derivative ===
The $a$-th derivative of a function $f$ at a point $x$ is a local property only when $a$ is an integer; this is not the case for non-integer power derivatives. In other words, a non-integer fractional derivative of $f$ at $x=c$ depends on all values of $f$, even those far away from $c$. Therefore, it is expected that the fractional derivative operation involves some sort of boundary conditions, involving information on the function further out.

The fractional derivative of a function of order $a$ is nowadays often defined by means of the Fourier or Mellin integral transforms.

== Generalizations ==
=== Erdélyi–Kober operator ===
The Erdélyi–Kober operator is an integral operator introduced by Arthur Erdélyi (1940). and Hermann Kober (1940) and is given by
$$\frac{x^{-\nu-\alpha+1}}{\Gamma(\alpha)}\int_0^x \left(t-x\right)^{\alpha-1}t^{-\alpha-\nu}f(t) \,dt\,,$$

which generalizes the Riemann–Liouville fractional integral and the Weyl integral.

== Functional calculus ==
In the context of functional analysis, functions f(D) more general than powers are studied in the functional calculus of spectral theory. The theory of pseudo-differential operators also allows one to consider powers of D. The operators arising are examples of singular integral operators; and the generalisation of the classical theory to higher dimensions is called the theory of Riesz potentials. So there are a number of contemporary theories available, within which fractional calculus can be discussed.

== Applications ==
=== Fractional conservation of mass ===
As described by Wheatcraft and Meerschaert (2008), a fractional conservation of mass equation is needed to model fluid flow when the control volume is not large enough compared to the scale of heterogeneity and when the flux within the control volume is non-linear. In the referenced paper, the fractional conservation of mass equation for fluid flow is:
$$-\rho \left(\nabla^\alpha \cdot \vec{u} \right) = \Gamma(\alpha +1)\Delta x^{1-\alpha} \rho \left (\beta_s+\phi \beta_w \right ) \frac{\partial p}{\partial t}$$

=== Electrochemical analysis ===
When studying the redox behavior of a substrate in solution, a voltage is applied at an electrode surface to force electron transfer between electrode and substrate. The resulting electron transfer is measured as a current. The current depends upon the concentration of substrate at the electrode surface. As substrate is consumed, fresh substrate diffuses to the electrode as described by Fick's laws of diffusion. Taking the Laplace transform of Fick's second law yields an ordinary second-order differential equation (here in dimensionless form):
$$\frac{d^2}{d x^2} C(x,s) = sC(x,s)$$

whose solution C(x,s) contains a one-half power dependence on s. Taking the derivative of C(x,s) and then the inverse Laplace transform yields the following relationship:
$$\frac{d}{d x} C(x,t) = \frac{d^{\scriptstyle{\frac{1}{2}}}}{d t^{\scriptstyle{\frac{1}{2}}}}C(x,t)$$

which relates the concentration of substrate at the electrode surface to the current. This relationship is applied in electrochemical kinetics to elucidate mechanistic behavior. For example, it has been used to study the rate of dimerization of substrates upon electrochemical reduction.

=== Groundwater flow problem ===
In 2013–2014 Atangana et al. described some groundwater flow problems using the concept of a derivative with fractional order. In these works, the classical Darcy law is generalized by regarding the water flow as a function of a non-integer order derivative of the piezometric head. This generalized law and the law of conservation of mass are then used to derive a new equation for groundwater flow.

=== Fractional advection dispersion equation ===
This equation has been shown useful for modeling contaminant flow in heterogenous porous media.

Atangana and Kilicman extended the fractional advection dispersion equation to a variable order equation. In their work, the hydrodynamic dispersion equation was generalized using the concept of a variational order derivative. The modified equation was numerically solved via the Crank–Nicolson method. The stability and convergence in numerical simulations showed that the modified equation is more reliable in predicting the movement of pollution in deformable aquifers than equations with constant fractional and integer derivatives.

=== Time-space fractional diffusion equation models ===
Anomalous diffusion processes in complex media can be well characterized by using fractional-order diffusion equation models. The time derivative term corresponds to long-time heavy tail decay and the spatial derivative for diffusion nonlocality. The time-space fractional diffusion governing equation can be written as
$$\frac{\partial^\alpha u}{\partial t^\alpha}=-K (-\Delta)^\beta u.$$

A simple extension of the fractional derivative is the variable-order fractional derivative, α and β are changed into α(x, t) and β(x, t). Its applications in anomalous diffusion modeling can be found in the reference.

=== Structural damping models ===
Fractional derivatives are used to model viscoelastic damping in certain types of materials like polymers.

=== PID controllers ===
Generalizing PID controllers to use fractional orders can increase their degree of freedom. The new equation relating the control variable u(t) in terms of a measured error value e(t) can be written as
$$u(t) = K_\mathrm{p} e(t) + K_\mathrm{i} D_t^{-\alpha} e(t) + K_\mathrm{d} D_t^{\beta} e(t)$$

where α and β are positive fractional orders and K_{p}, K_{i}, and K_{d}, all non-negative, denote the coefficients for the proportional, integral, and derivative terms, respectively (sometimes denoted P, I, and D).

=== Acoustic wave equations for complex media ===
The propagation of acoustical waves in complex media, such as in biological tissue, commonly implies attenuation obeying a frequency power-law. This kind of phenomenon may be described using a causal wave equation which incorporates fractional time derivatives:
$$\nabla^2 u -\dfrac 1{c_0^2} \frac{\partial^2 u}{\partial t^2} + \tau_\sigma^\alpha \dfrac{\partial^\alpha}{\partial t^\alpha}\nabla^2 u - \dfrac {\tau_\epsilon^\beta}{c_0^2} \dfrac{\partial^{\beta+2} u}{\partial t^{\beta+2}} = 0\,.$$

See also Holm & Näsholm (2011) and the references therein. Such models are linked to the commonly recognized hypothesis that multiple relaxation phenomena give rise to the attenuation measured in complex media. This link is further described in Näsholm & Holm (2011b) and in the survey paper, as well as the Acoustic attenuation article. See Holm & Nasholm (2013) for a paper which compares fractional wave equations which model power-law attenuation. This book on power-law attenuation also covers the topic in more detail.

Pandey and Holm gave a physical meaning to fractional differential equations by deriving them from physical principles and interpreting the fractional-order in terms of the parameters of the acoustical media, example in fluid-saturated granular unconsolidated marine sediments. Interestingly, Pandey and Holm derived Lomnitz's law in seismology and Nutting's law in non-Newtonian rheology using the framework of fractional calculus. Nutting's law was used to model the wave propagation in marine sediments using fractional derivatives.

=== Fractional Schrödinger equation in quantum theory ===
The fractional Schrödinger equation, a fundamental equation of fractional quantum mechanics, has the following form:
$$i\hbar \frac{\partial \psi (\mathbf{r},t)}{\partial t}=D_{\alpha } \left(-\hbar^2\Delta \right)^{\frac{\alpha}{2}}\psi (\mathbf{r},t)+V(\mathbf{r},t)\psi (\mathbf{r},t)\,.$$

where the solution of the equation is the wavefunction ψ(r, t) – the quantum mechanical probability amplitude for the particle to have a given position vector r at any given time t, and ħ is the reduced Planck constant. The potential energy function V(r, t) depends on the system.

Further, $\Delta = \frac{\partial^2}{\partial\mathbf{r}^2}$ is the Laplace operator, and D_{α} is a scale constant with physical dimension [D_{α}] = J^{1 − α}·m^{α}·s^{−α} = kg^{1 − α}·m^{2 − α}·s^{α − 2}, (at α = 2, $D_2 = \frac{1}{2m}$ for a particle of mass m), and the operator (−ħ^{2}Δ)^{α/2} is the 3-dimensional fractional quantum Riesz derivative defined by
$$(-\hbar^2\Delta)^\frac{\alpha}{2}\psi (\mathbf{r},t) = \frac 1 {(2\pi \hbar)^3} \int d^3 p e^{\frac{i}{\hbar} \mathbf{p}\cdot\mathbf{r}}|\mathbf{p}|^\alpha \varphi (\mathbf{p},t) \,.$$

The index α in the fractional Schrödinger equation is the Lévy index, 1 < α ≤ 2.

==== Variable-order fractional Schrödinger equation ====
As a natural generalization of the fractional Schrödinger equation, the variable-order fractional Schrödinger equation has been exploited to study fractional quantum phenomena:
$$i\hbar \frac{\partial \psi^{\alpha(\mathbf{r})} (\mathbf{r},t)}{\partial t^{\alpha(\mathbf{r})} } = \left(-\hbar^2\Delta \right)^{\frac{\beta(t)}{2}}\psi (\mathbf{r},t)+V(\mathbf{r},t)\psi (\mathbf{r},t),$$

where $\Delta = \frac{\partial^2}{\partial\mathbf{r}^2}$ is the Laplace operator and the operator (−ħ^{2}Δ)^{β(t)/2} is the variable-order fractional quantum Riesz derivative.

== See also ==
- Acoustic attenuation
- Autoregressive fractionally integrated moving average
- Initialized fractional calculus
- Nonlocal operator

=== Other fractional theories ===
- Fractional-order system
- Fractional Fourier transform
- Prabhakar function
