= Differintegral =

Operator in fractional calculus

In fractional calculus, an area of mathematical analysis, the differintegral is a combined differentiation/integration operator. Applied to a function f, the q-differintegral of f, here denoted by

$$\mathbb{D}^q f$$

is the fractional derivative (if q > 0) or fractional integral (if q < 0). If q = 0, then the q-th differintegral of a function is the function itself. In the context of fractional integration and differentiation, there are several definitions of the differintegral.

== Standard definitions ==
The four most common forms are:

- The Riemann–Liouville differintegral
  This is the simplest and easiest to use, and consequently it is the most often used. It is a generalization of the Cauchy formula for repeated integration to arbitrary order. Here, $n = \lceil q \rceil$.
  $$\begin{align}
{}^{RL}_a\mathbb{D}^q_tf(t) & = \frac{d^qf(t)}{d(t-a)^q} \\
& =\frac{1}{\Gamma(n-q)} \frac{d^n}{dt^n} \int_{a}^t (t-\tau)^{n-q-1}f(\tau)d\tau
\end{align}$$
- The Grunwald–Letnikov differintegral
  The Grunwald–Letnikov differintegral is a direct generalization of the definition of a derivative. It is more difficult to use than the Riemann–Liouville differintegral, but can sometimes be used to solve problems that the Riemann–Liouville cannot.
  $$\begin{align}
{}^{GL}_a\mathbb{D}^q_tf(t) & = \frac{d^qf(t)}{d(t-a)^q} \\
& =\lim_{N \to \infty}\left[\frac{t-a}{N}\right]^{-q}\sum_{j=0}^{N-1}(-1)^j{q \choose j}f\left(t-j\left[\frac{t-a}{N}\right]\right)
\end{align}$$
- The Weyl differintegral
  This is formally similar to the Riemann–Liouville differintegral, but applies to periodic functions, with integral zero over a period.
- The Caputo differintegral
  In opposite to the Riemann-Liouville differintegral, Caputo derivative of a constant $f(t)$ is equal to zero. Moreover, a form of the Laplace transform allows to simply evaluate the initial conditions by computing finite, integer-order derivatives at point $a$.
  $$\begin{align}
{}^{C}_a\mathbb{D}^q_tf(t) & = \frac{d^qf(t)}{d(t-a)^q} \\
& =\frac{1}{\Gamma(n-q)} \int_{a}^t \frac{f^{(n)}(\tau)}{(t-\tau)^{q-n+1}}d\tau
\end{align}$$

== Definitions via transforms ==
The definitions of fractional derivatives given by Liouville, Fourier, and Grunwald and Letnikov coincide. They can be represented via Laplace, Fourier transforms or via Newton series expansion.

Recall the continuous Fourier transform, here denoted $\mathcal{F}$:
$$F(\omega) =  \mathcal{F}\{f(t)\} = \frac{1}{\sqrt{2\pi}}\int_{-\infty}^\infty f(t) e^{- i\omega t}\,dt$$

Using the continuous Fourier transform, in Fourier space, differentiation transforms into a multiplication:
$$\mathcal{F}\left[\frac{df(t)}{dt}\right] = i \omega \mathcal{F}[f(t)]$$

So,
$$\frac{d^nf(t)}{dt^n} = \mathcal{F}^{-1}\left\{(i \omega)^n\mathcal{F}[f(t)]\right\}$$
which generalizes to
$$\mathbb{D}^qf(t) = \mathcal{F}^{-1}\left\{(i \omega)^q\mathcal{F}[f(t)]\right\}.$$

Under the bilateral Laplace transform, here denoted by $\mathcal{L}$ and defined as $\mathcal{L}[f(t)] =\int_{-\infty}^\infty e^{-st} f(t)\, dt$, differentiation transforms into a multiplication
$$\mathcal{L}\left[\frac{df(t)}{dt}\right] = s\mathcal{L}[f(t)].$$

Generalizing to arbitrary order and solving for $\mathbb{D}^qf(t)$, one obtains
$$\mathbb{D}^qf(t)=\mathcal{L}^{-1}\left\{s^q\mathcal{L}[f(t)]\right\}.$$

Representation via Newton series is the Newton interpolation over consecutive integer orders:

$$\mathbb{D}^qf(t) =\sum_{m=0}^{\infty} \binom {q}m \sum_{k=0}^m\binom mk(-1)^{m-k}f^{(k)}(x).$$

For fractional derivative definitions described in this section, the following identities hold:

$$\mathbb{D}^q(t^n)=\frac{\Gamma(n+1)}{\Gamma(n+1-q)}t^{n-q}$$

$$\mathbb{D}^q(\sin(t))=\sin \left( t+\frac{q\pi}{2} \right)$$

$\mathbb{D}^q(e^{at})=a^q e^{at}$

== Basic formal properties ==
- Linearity rules
  $$\mathbb{D}^q(f+g) = \mathbb{D}^q(f)+\mathbb{D}^q(g)$$

$$\mathbb{D}^q(af) = a\mathbb{D}^q(f)$$

- Zero rule
  $$\mathbb{D}^0 f = f$$
- Product rule
  $$\mathbb{D}^q_t(fg) = \sum_{j=0}^{\infty} {q \choose j}\mathbb{D}^j_t(f)\mathbb{D}^{q-j}_t(g)$$

In general, composition (or semigroup) rule is a desirable property, but is hard to achieve mathematically and hence is not always completely satisfied by each proposed operator; this forms part of the decision making process on which one to choose:

- $\mathbb{D}^a\mathbb{D}^{b}f = \mathbb{D}^{a+b}f$ (ideally)
- $\mathbb{D}^a\mathbb{D}^{b}f \neq \mathbb{D}^{a+b}f$ (in practice)

== See also ==
- Fractional-order integrator
