= Riemann–Liouville integral =

Integral transform

In mathematics, the Riemann–Liouville integral associates with a real function $f: \mathbb{R} \rightarrow \mathbb{R}$ another function I^{α} f of the same kind for each value of the parameter α > 0. The integral is a manner of generalization of the repeated antiderivative of f in the sense that for positive integer values of α, I^{α} f is an iterated antiderivative of f of order α. The Riemann–Liouville integral is named for Bernhard Riemann and Joseph Liouville, the latter of whom was the first to consider the possibility of fractional calculus in 1832. The operator agrees with the Euler transform, after Leonhard Euler, when applied to analytic functions. It was generalized to arbitrary dimensions by Marcel Riesz, who introduced the Riesz potential.

== Motivation ==
The Riemann-Liouville integral is motivated by the Cauchy formula for repeated integration: for a function f continuous on the interval [a,x], the Cauchy formula for n-fold repeated integration states that
$$I^n f(x) = f^{(-n)}(x) = \frac{1}{(n-1)!} \int_a^x\left(x-t\right)^{n-1} f(t)\,\mathrm{d}t.$$
This formula can be generalized to any positive real number ɑ replacing the positive integer n. We then obtain the definition of the Riemann-Liouville fractional integral:

$$I^\alpha f(x) = \frac{1}{\Gamma(\alpha)} \int_a^x\left(x-t\right)^{\alpha-1} f(t)\,\mathrm{d}t$$

== Definition ==
The Riemann–Liouville integral is defined by

$$I^\alpha f(x) = \frac{1}{\Gamma(\alpha)}\int_a^x(x-t)^{\alpha-1}f(t)\,dt$$

where Γ is the gamma function and a is an arbitrary but fixed base point. The integral is well-defined provided f is a locally integrable function, and α is a complex number in the half-plane Re(α) > 0. The dependence on the base-point a is often suppressed, and represents a freedom in constant of integration. Clearly I^{1} f is an antiderivative of f (of first order), and for positive integer values of α, I^{α} f is an antiderivative of order α by Cauchy formula for repeated integration. Another notation, which emphasizes the base point, is

$${}_aD_x^{-\alpha}f(x) = \frac{1}{\Gamma(\alpha)}\int_a^x (x-t)^{\alpha-1}f(t)\,dt.$$

This also makes sense if a = −∞, with suitable restrictions on f.

The fundamental relations hold

$$\frac{d}{dx}I^{\alpha+1} f(x) = I^\alpha f(x),\quad I^\alpha(I^\beta f) = I^{\alpha+\beta}f,$$

the latter of which is a semigroup property. These properties make possible not only the definition of fractional integration, but also of fractional differentiation, by taking enough derivatives of I^{α} f.

== Properties ==
Fix a bounded interval (a,b). The operator I^{α} associates to each integrable function f on (a,b) the function I^{α} f on (a,b) which is also integrable by Fubini's theorem. Thus I^{α} defines a linear operator on L^{1}(a,b):

$$I^\alpha : L^1(a,b) \to L^1(a,b).$$

Fubini's theorem also shows that this operator is continuous with respect to the Banach space structure on L^{1}, and that the following inequality holds:

$$\left \|I^\alpha f \right \|_1 \le \frac{|b-a|^{\Re(\alpha)}}{\Re(\alpha)|\Gamma(\alpha)|}\|f\|_1.$$

Here ‖ · ‖_{1} denotes the norm on L^{1}(a,b).

More generally, by Hölder's inequality, it follows that if f ∈ L^{p}(a, b), then I^{α} f ∈ L^{p}(a, b) as well, and the analogous inequality holds

$$\left \|I^\alpha f \right \|_p \le \frac{|b-a|^{\Re(\alpha)/p}}{\Re(\alpha)|\Gamma(\alpha)|}\|f\|_p$$

where ‖ · ‖_{p} is the L^{p} norm on the interval (a,b). Thus we have a bounded linear operator I^{α} : L^{p}(a, b) → L^{p}(a, b). Furthermore, I^{α} f → f in the L^{p} sense as α → 0 along the real axis. That is

$$\lim_{\alpha\to 0^+} \|I^\alpha f - f\|_p = 0$$

for all p ≥ 1. Moreover, by estimating the maximal function of I, one can show that the limit I^{α} f → f holds pointwise almost everywhere.

The operator I^{α} is well-defined on the set of locally integrable function on the whole real line $\mathbb{R}$. It defines a bounded transformation on any of the Banach spaces of functions of exponential type $X_{\sigma} = L^1(e^{-\sigma|t|}dt),$ consisting of locally integrable functions for which the norm

$$\|f\| = \int_{-\infty}^\infty |f(t)|e^{-\sigma|t|}\,dt$$

is finite. For f ∈ X_{σ}, the Laplace transform of I^{α} f takes the particularly simple form

$$(\mathcal{L}I^\alpha f)(s) = s^{-\alpha}F(s)$$

for Re(s) > σ. Here F(s) denotes the Laplace transform of f, and this property expresses that I^{α} is a Fourier multiplier.

== Fractional derivatives ==
One can define fractional-order derivatives of f as well by

$$\frac{d^\alpha}{dx^\alpha} f \, \overset{\text{def}}{=} \frac{d^{\lceil\alpha\rceil}}{dx^{\lceil\alpha\rceil}} I^{\lceil \alpha \rceil-\alpha}f$$

where ⌈ · ⌉ denotes the ceiling function. One also obtains a differintegral interpolating between differentiation and integration by defining

$$D^\alpha_x f(x) = \begin{cases} \frac{d^{\lceil\alpha\rceil}}{dx^{\lceil\alpha\rceil}} I^{\lceil\alpha\rceil-\alpha}f(x)& \alpha>0\\ f(x) & \alpha=0\\ I^{-\alpha}f(x) & \alpha<0. \end{cases}$$

An alternative fractional derivative was introduced by Caputo in 1967, and produces a derivative that has different properties: it produces zero from constant functions and, more importantly, the initial value terms of the Laplace Transform are expressed by means of the values of that function and of its derivative of integer order rather than the derivatives of fractional order as in the Riemann–Liouville derivative. The Caputo fractional derivative with base point x, is then:

$$D_x^{\alpha}f(y)=\frac{1}{\Gamma(1-\alpha)}\int_x^y (u-x)^{-\alpha}f'(y-u)du.$$

Another representation is:

$${}_a\tilde{D}^\alpha_x f(x)=I^{\lceil \alpha\rceil-\alpha}\left(\frac{d^{\lceil \alpha\rceil}f}{dx^{\lceil \alpha\rceil}}\right).$$

== Fractional derivative of a basic power function ==
The half derivative (purple curve) of the function f(x) = x (blue curve) together with the first derivative (red curve).

The animation shows the derivative operator oscillating between the antiderivative (α = −1: y = 1/2x^{2}) and the derivative (α = +1: y = 1) of the simple power function y = x continuously.

Let us assume that f(x) is a monomial of the form

$$f(x) = x^k\,.$$

The first derivative is as usual

$$f'(x) = \frac{d}{dx}f(x) = k x^{k-1}\,.$$

Repeating this gives the more general result that

$$\frac{d^a}{dx^a}x^k = \dfrac{k!}{(k-a)!}x^{k-a}\,,$$

which, after replacing the factorials with the gamma function, leads to

$$\frac{d^a}{dx^a}x^k = \dfrac{\Gamma(k+1)}{\Gamma(k-a+1)}x^{k-a}, \quad\ k > 0.$$

For k = 1 and a = 1/2, we obtain the half-derivative of the function $x \mapsto x$ as

$$\frac{d^\frac12}{dx^\frac12}x=\frac{\Gamma(1+1)}{\Gamma\left(1-\frac12 + 1\right)} x^{1-\frac12}=\frac{\Gamma(2)}{\Gamma\left(\frac{3}{2}\right)}x^\frac12 = \frac{1}{\frac{\sqrt{\pi}}{2}}x^\frac12.$$

To demonstrate that this is, in fact, the "half derivative" (where H^{2}f(x) = Df(x)), we repeat the process to get:

$$\dfrac{d^\frac12}{dx^\frac12} \dfrac{2x^{\frac12}}{\sqrt{\pi}}
=\frac{2}{\sqrt{\pi}}\dfrac{\Gamma(1+\frac12)}{\Gamma(\frac12-\frac12+1)}x^{\frac12-\frac12}
=\frac{2}{\sqrt{\pi}} \frac{\Gamma\left(\frac{3}{2}\right)}{\Gamma(1)} x^0
=\frac{2 \frac{\sqrt{\pi}}{2} x^0}{\sqrt{\pi}}=1\,,$$

(because $\Gamma\!\left(\frac{3}{2}\right) = \frac{\sqrt{\pi}}{2}$ and Γ(1) = 1) which is indeed the expected result of

$$\left(\frac{d^\frac12}{dx^\frac12} \frac{d^\frac12}{dx^\frac12}\right)\!x = \frac{d}{dx} x = 1\,.$$

For negative integer power k, 1/$\Gamma$ is 0, so it is convenient to use the following relation:

$$\frac{d^a}{dx^a}x^{-k} = \left(-1\right)^a\dfrac{\Gamma(k+a)}{\Gamma(k)}x^{-(k+a)} \quad\text{ for } k \ge 0.$$

This extension of the above differential operator need not be constrained only to real powers; it also applies for complex powers. For example, the (1 + i)-th derivative of the (1 − i)-th derivative yields the second derivative. Also setting negative values for a yields integrals.

For a general function f(x) and 0 < α < 1, the complete fractional derivative is

$$D^\alpha f(x)=\frac{1}{\Gamma(1-\alpha)}\frac{d}{dx} \int_0^x \left(x-t\right)^{-\alpha}f(t) \, dt.$$

For arbitrary α, since the gamma function is infinite for negative (real) integers, it is necessary to apply the fractional derivative after the integer derivative has been performed. For example,

$$D^\frac32 f(x) = D^\frac12 D^1 f(x)=D^\frac12 \frac d {dx} f(x).$$

== Laplace transform ==
We can also come at the question via the Laplace transform. Knowing that

$$\mathcal L \left\{Jf\right\}(s) = \mathcal L \left\{\int_0^t f(\tau)\,d\tau\right\}(s) = \frac1 s \bigl(\mathcal L\left\{f\right\}\bigr)(s)$$

and

$$\mathcal L \left\{J^2f\right\}=\frac1s\bigl(\mathcal L \left\{Jf\right\} \bigr)(s)=\frac1{s^2}\bigl(\mathcal L\left\{f\right\}\bigr)(s)$$

and so on, we assert

$$J^\alpha f=\mathcal L^{-1}\left\{s^{-\alpha}\bigl(\mathcal L\{f\}\bigr)(s)\right\}$$.

For example,

$$J^\alpha(t^k) = \mathcal L^{-1}\left\{\frac{\Gamma(k+1)}{s^{\alpha+k+1}}\right\} = \frac{\Gamma(k+1)}{\Gamma(\alpha+k+1)} t^{\alpha+k}$$

as expected. Indeed, given the convolution rule

$$\mathcal L\{f*g\}=\bigl(\mathcal L\{f\}\bigr)\bigl(\mathcal L\{g\}\bigr)$$

and shorthanding p(x) = x^{α − 1} for clarity, we find that

$$\begin{align}
\left(J^\alpha f\right)(t) &= \frac{1}{\Gamma(\alpha)}\mathcal L^{-1}\left\{\bigl(\mathcal L\{p\}\bigr)\bigl(\mathcal L\{f\}\bigr)\right\}\\
&=\frac{1}{\Gamma(\alpha)}(p*f)\\
&=\frac{1}{\Gamma(\alpha)}\int_0^t p(t-\tau)f(\tau)\,d\tau\\
&=\frac{1}{\Gamma(\alpha)}\int_0^t\left(t-\tau\right)^{\alpha-1}f(\tau)\,d\tau\\
\end{align}$$

which is what Cauchy gave us above.

Laplace transforms "work" on relatively few functions, but they are often useful for solving fractional differential equations.

== See also ==
- Caputo fractional derivative
