= Cyclic voltammetry =

Method of analyzing electrochemical reactions

Figure 1. Typical cyclic voltammogram where j_{pc} and j_{pa} show the peak cathodic and anodic current densities respectively for a reversible reaction with a 5 mM Fe redox couple reacting with a graphite electrode in 1M potassium nitrate solution. E_{PA} and E_{PC} denote the corresponding electrode potentials (vs. Ag/AgCl) of maximal reaction rates. For an ideal reversible (Nernstian) reaction the theoretical peak separation (E_{PA} - E_{PC}) is 57 mV.

In electrochemistry, cyclic voltammetry (CV) is a type of voltammetric measurement where the potential of the working electrode is ramped linearly versus time. Unlike in linear sweep voltammetry, after the set potential is reached in a CV experiment, the working electrode's potential is ramped in the opposite direction to return to the initial potential. These cycles in potential are repeated until the voltammetric trace reaches a cyclic steady state. The current at the working electrode is plotted versus the voltage at the working electrode to yield the cyclic voltammogram (see Figure 1). Cyclic voltammetry is generally used to study the electrochemical properties of an analyte in solution or of a molecule that is adsorbed onto the electrode and to quantify electrochemical surface area of catalysts in electrochemical cells.

== Experimental method ==
In cyclic voltammetry (CV), the electrode potential is ramped linearly versus time in cyclical phases. The rate of voltage change over time during each of these phases is known as the scan rate (V/s). In a standard three-electrode cell, the potential is measured between the working electrode and the reference electrode, while the current is measured between the working electrode and the counter electrode. These data are plotted as current density (j, mA/cm^{2}) versus potential (typically corrected for Ohmic/iR drop) (E, V). During the initial forward scan from t_{0} to t_{1}, an increasingly oxidative (positive) potential is applied, and the anodic (positive) current increases over this time period due to the charging of the electric double layer. The spike in anodic (positive) current observed between t_{0} and t_{1} is due to the oxidation of the analyte in the solution when the correct potential is reached. The current decreases after the initial spike as the concentration of oxidable analyte is depleted near the surface of the working electrode due to mass transport limitations.

The graph often has a characteristic "duck-like" shape. Comparing the parts of the oxidation and reduction graph portions allows determination of many electrochemical parameters. For example, if the redox couple is reversible, then during the reverse scan (from t_{1} to t_{2}), the oxidized analyte will start to be re-reduced, giving rise to a cathodic current of opposite polarity. The more reversible the redox couple is, the more similar the oxidation peak will be in shape to the reduction peak. The difference in potential between when the maximum current is measured in the two directions is the redox potential.

If the electron transfer at the working electrode surface is fast and the current is limited by the diffusion of analyte species to the electrode surface, then the peak current will be proportional to the square root of the scan rate. This relationship is described by the Randles–Sevcik equation. In this situation, the CV experiment only samples a small portion of the solution, i.e., the diffusion layer at the electrode surface.

== Characterization ==
The utility of cyclic voltammetry is highly dependent on the analyte being studied. The analyte has to be redox active within the potential window to be scanned.

=== The analyte is in solution ===
==== Reversible couples ====
Potential against time, current against time and voltammogram (current against potential) for a one-electron, reversible redox couple diffusing freely in solution. The current density is normalised by 0.446 F C sqrt(D F nu / R T). Reductive current counted as negative.

Often the analyte displays a reversible CV wave (such as that depicted in Figure 1), which is observed when all of the initial analyte can be recovered after a forward and reverse scan cycle. Although such reversible couples are simpler to analyze, they contain less information than more complex waveforms.

The waveform of even reversible couples is complex owing to the combined effects of polarization and diffusion. The difference between the two peak potentials (E_{p}), ΔE_{p}, is of particular interest.

ΔE_{p} = E_{pa} - E_{pc} > 0

This difference mainly results from the effects of analyte diffusion rates. In the ideal case of a reversible 1e- couple (i.e., Nernstian), ΔE_{p} is 57 mV and the full-width half-max of the forward scan peak is 59 mV. Typical values observed experimentally are greater, often approaching 70 or 80 mV. The waveform is also affected by the rate of electron transfer, usually discussed as the activation barrier for electron transfer. A theoretical description of polarization overpotential is in part described by the Butler–Volmer equation and Cottrell equation. In an ideal system the relationship reduces to $E_{pa}-E_{pc}=\frac{56.5\text{ mV}}{n}$ for an n electron process.

Focusing on current, reversible couples are characterized by i_{pa}/i_{pc} = 1.

When a reversible peak is observed, thermodynamic information in the form of a half cell potential E^{0}_{1/2} can be determined. When waves are semi-reversible (i_{pa}/i_{pc} is close but not equal to 1), it may be possible to determine even more specific information (see electrochemical reaction mechanism).

The current maxima for oxidation and reduction itself depend on the scan rate, see the figure.

Maximum anodic and cathodic peak currents expressed as $j_{\,max}^{\,ox}$ and $j_{\,max}^{\,red}$ as function of scan rate for a graphite electrode in the above-mentioned electrolyte 5mM Fe analyte in 1 M $\mathrm{ KNO_{3} }$. Dotted lines are fits with $x=0.5$ in the power fit. Data on GitHub

To study the nature of the electrochemical reaction mechanism it is useful to perform a power fit according to

$$j_{max}^{\;ox,read} = j_{0} + A \cdot \bigg(\frac{scan\,rate}{mV/s}\bigg)^{x}$$

A fit with $x= 0.5$ in the figure shows the proportionality of the peak currents to the square root of the scan rate when additionally $\mathrm{ j_{0} < A }$ is fulfilled.

This leads to the so-called Randles–Sevcik equation and the rate determining step of this electrochemical redox reaction can be assigned to diffusion.

==== Nonreversible couples ====
Many redox processes observed by CV are quasi-reversible or non-reversible. In such cases the thermodynamic potential E^{0}_{1/2} is often deduced by simulation. The irreversibility is indicated by i_{pa}/i_{pc} ≠ 1. Deviations from unity are attributable to a subsequent chemical reaction that is triggered by the electron transfer. Such EC processes can be complex, involving isomerization, dissociation, association, etc.

=== The analyte is adsorbed onto the electrode surface ===
Adsorbed species give simple voltammetric responses: ideally, at slow scan rates, there is no peak separation, the peak width is 90mV for a one-electron redox couple, and the peak current and peak area are proportional to scan rate (observing that the peak current is proportional to scan rate proves that the redox species that gives the peak is actually immobilised). The effect of increasing the scan rate can be used to measure the rate of interfacial electron transfer and/or the rates of reactions that are coupltransfer. This technique has been useful to study redox proteins, some of which readily adsorb on various electrode materials, but the theory for biological and non-biological redox molecules is the same (see the page about protein film voltammetry).

== Experimental setup ==
CV experiments are conducted on a solution in a cell fitted with electrodes. The solution consists of the solvent, in which is dissolved electrolyte and the species to be studied.

=== The cell ===
A standard CV experiment employs a cell fitted with three electrodes: reference electrode, working electrode, and counter electrode. This combination is sometimes referred to as a three-electrode setup. Electrolyte is usually added to the sample solution to ensure sufficient conductivity. The solvent, electrolyte, and material composition of the working electrode will determine the potential range that can be accessed during the experiment.

The electrodes are immobile and sit in unstirred solutions during cyclic voltammetry. This "still" solution method gives rise to cyclic voltammetry's characteristic diffusion-controlled peaks. This method also allows a portion of the analyte to remain after reduction or oxidation so that it may display further redox activity. Stirring the solution between cyclic voltammetry traces is important in order to supply the electrode surface with fresh analyte for each new experiment. The solubility of an analyte can change drastically with its overall charge; as such it is common for reduced or oxidized analyte species to precipitate out onto the electrode. This layering of analyte can insulate the electrode surface, display its own redox activity in subsequent scans, or otherwise alter the electrode surface in a way that affects the CV measurements. For this reason it is often necessary to clean the electrodes between scans.

Common materials for the working electrode include glassy carbon, platinum, and gold. These electrodes are generally encased in a rod of inert insulator with a disk exposed at one end. A regular working electrode has a radius within an order of magnitude of 1 mm. Having a controlled surface area with a well-defined shape is necessary for being able to interpret cyclic voltammetry results.

To run cyclic voltammetry experiments at very high scan rates a regular working electrode is insufficient. High scan rates create peaks with large currents and increased resistances, which result in distortions. Ultramicroelectrodes can be used to minimize the current and resistance.

The counter electrode, also known as the auxiliary or second electrode, can be any material that conducts current easily, will not react with the bulk solution, and has a surface area much larger than the working electrode. Common choices are platinum and graphite. Reactions occurring at the counter electrode surface are unimportant as long as it continues to conduct current well. To maintain the observed current the counter electrode will often oxidize or reduce the solvent or bulk electrolyte.

=== Solvents ===
CV can be conducted using a variety of solutions. Solvent choice for cyclic voltammetry takes into account several requirements. The solvent must dissolve the analyte and high concentrations of the supporting electrolyte. It must also be stable in the potential window of the experiment with respect to the working electrode. It must not react with either the analyte or the supporting electrolyte. It must be pure to prevent interference.

=== Electrolyte ===
The electrolyte ensures good electrical conductivity and minimizes iR drop such that the recorded potentials correspond to actual potentials. For aqueous solutions, many electrolytes are available, but typical ones are alkali metal salts of perchlorate and nitrate. In nonaqueous solvents, the range of electrolytes is more limited, and a popular choice is tetrabutylammonium hexafluorophosphate.

== Related potentiometric techniques ==
Potentiodynamic techniques also exist that add low-amplitude AC perturbations to a potential ramp and measure variable response in a single frequency (AC voltammetry) or in many frequencies simultaneously (potentiodynamic electrochemical impedance spectroscopy). The response in alternating current is two-dimensional, characterized by both amplitude and phase. These data can be analyzed to determine information about different chemical processes (charge transfer, diffusion, double layer charging, etc.). Frequency response analysis enables simultaneous monitoring of the various processes that contribute to the potentiodynamic AC response of an electrochemical system.

Whereas cyclic voltammetry is not hydrodynamic voltammetry, useful electrochemical methods are. In such cases, flow is achieved at the electrode surface by stirring the solution, pumping the solution, or rotating the electrode as is the case with rotating disk electrodes and rotating ring-disk electrodes. Such techniques target steady state conditions and produce waveforms that appear the same when scanned in either the positive or negative directions, thus limiting them to linear sweep voltammetry.

== Applications ==
Cyclic voltammetry (CV) has become an important and widely used electroanalytical technique in many areas of chemistry. It is often used to study a variety of redox processes, to determine the stability of reaction products, the presence of intermediates in redox reactions, electron transfer kinetics, and the reversibility of a reaction. It can be used for electrochemical deposition of thin films or for determining suitable reduction potential range of the ions present in electrolyte for electrochemical deposition. CV can also be used to determine the electron stoichiometry of a system, the diffusion coefficient of an analyte, and the formal reduction potential of an analyte, which can be used as an identification tool. In addition, because concentration is proportional to current in a reversible, Nernstian system, the concentration of an unknown solution can be determined by generating a calibration curve of current vs. concentration.

In cellular biology, it is used to measure the concentrations of target molecules (such as specific proteins or DNA) or flow of conductive ions in living organisms. In organometallic chemistry, it is used to evaluate redox mechanisms.

=== Measuring antioxidant capacity ===
Cyclical voltammetry can be used to determine the antioxidant capacity in food and even skin. Low molecular weight antioxidants, molecules that prevent other molecules from being oxidized by acting as reducing agents, are important in living cells because they inhibit cell damage or death caused by oxidation reactions that produce radicals. Examples of antioxidants include flavonoids, whose antioxidant activity is greatly increased with more hydroxyl groups. The traditional method for evaluating antioxidant potential is via an assay, which is a time consuming process, possibly unrepresentative of a molecule's full antioxidant potential. Cyclic voltammetry addresses both issues, allowing faster experiment iteration, and more specific analysis. Furthermore, antioxidants are quickly oxidized at inert electrodes, so the half-wave potential can be utilized to determine antioxidant capacity. Whenever cyclic voltammetry is utilized, it is usually compared to spectrophotometry or high-performance liquid chromatography (HPLC). Applications of the technique extend to food chemistry, where it is used to determine the antioxidant activity of red wine, chocolate, and hops. Additionally, it even has uses in the world of medicine in that it can determine antioxidants in the skin.

=== Evaluation of a technique ===
The technique being evaluated uses voltammetric sensors combined in an electronic tongue (ET) to observe the antioxidant capacity in red wines. These electronic tongues (ETs) consist of multiple sensing units like voltammetric sensors, which will have unique responses to certain compounds. This approach is optimal to use since samples of high complexity can be analyzed with high cross-selectivity. Thus, the sensors can be sensitive to pH and antioxidants. As usual, the voltage in the cell was monitored using a working electrode and a reference electrode (silver/silver chloride electrode). Furthermore, a platinum counter electrode allows the current to continue to flow during the experiment. The Carbon Paste Electrodes sensor (CPE) and the Graphite-Epoxy Composite (GEC) electrode are tested in a saline solution before the scanning of the wine so that a reference signal can be obtained. The wines are then ready to be scanned, once with CPE and once with GEC. While cyclic voltammetry was successfully used to generate currents using the wine samples, the signals were complex and needed an additional extraction stage. It was found that the ET method could successfully analyze wine's antioxidant capacity as it agreed with traditional methods like TEAC, Folin-Ciocalteu, and I280 indexes. Additionally, the time was reduced, the sample did not have to be pretreated, and other reagents were unnecessary, all of which diminished the popularity of traditional methods. Thus, cyclic voltammetry successfully determines the antioxidant capacity and even improves previous results.

=== Antioxidant capacity of chocolate and hops ===
The phenolic antioxidants for cocoa powder, dark chocolate, and milk chocolate can also be determined via cyclic voltammetry. In order to achieve this, the anodic peaks are calculated and analyzed with the knowledge that the first and third anodic peaks can be assigned to the first and second oxidation of flavonoids, while the second anodic peak represents phenolic acids. Using the graph produced by cyclic voltammetry, the total phenolic and flavonoid content can be deduced in each of the three samples. It was observed that cocoa powder and dark chocolate had the highest antioxidant capacity since they had high total phenolic and flavonoid content. Milk chocolate had the lowest capacity as it had the lowest phenolic and flavonoid content. While the antioxidant content was given using the cyclic voltammetry anodic peaks, HPLC must then be used to determine the purity of catechins and procyanidin in cocoa powder, dark chocolate, and milk chocolate.

Hops, the flowers used in making beer, contain antioxidant properties due to the presence of flavonoids and other polyphenolic compounds. In this cyclic voltammetry experiment, the working electrode voltage was determined using a ferricinium/ferrocene reference electrode. By comparing different hop extract samples, it was observed that the sample containing polyphenols that were oxidized at less positive potentials proved to have better antioxidant capacity.

== See also ==
- Current–voltage characteristic
- Electroanalytical methods
- Fast-scan cyclic voltammetry
- Randles–Sevcik equation
- Voltammetry
- Electrochemical surface area
- CO stripping
