= Fred C. Anson =

American electrochemist (1933–2024)

- Born: February 17, 1933; Los Angeles, California, United States
- Died: May 22, 2024 (aged 91); Santa Barbara, California
- Education: Caltech (B.S.), Harvard University (Ph.D)
- Spouse: Roxana Anson (m. 1959)
- Scientific career
- Fields: Electrochemistry
- Workplaces: California Institute of Technology
- Thesis: Studies in electrochemistry (1957)
- Doctoral advisor: James J. Lingane
- Other academic advisors: Ernest H. Swift
- Notable students: Undergrads: M.G. Finn; Post-docs: Theodore Kuwana

Frederick Colvig Anson (February 17, 1933 – May 22, 2024) was an American electrochemist and a long-time professor at the California Institute of Technology.

He received an honorary degree from the Paris Diderot University in 1933. He was an Instructor at Caltech between 1957 and 1958; Assistant Professor between 1958 and 1962, Associate Professor between 1962 and 1968, a Professor between 1968 and 1995, an Elizabeth W. Gilloon Gilloon Professor between 1995 and 2001, a Gilloon Professor Emeritus from 2001 until his death in 2024. He was an executive officer for Chemistry at Caltech between 1973 and 1977, and the chairman at Division of Chemistry and Chemical Engineering between 1984 and 1994. He received an honorary doctorate from the Sorbonne in 1993.

He was interested in the behavior of reactants on the surface of electrodes. During his lifetime he published more than 350 scientific papers.

== Early life and education ==
Anson was born on February 17, 1933 in Los Angeles and grew up in California's Wilmar (now South San Gabriel). There, as a kid, he delivered the Los Angeles Times as his first job. He attended Mark Keppel High School where he was encouraged by a teacher, a Caltech alumni, to apply for the university. It was in one of his visit with this teacher, that he attended a talk by Robert A. Millikan on Caltech's campus. He enrolled in 1950 and was awarded a scholarship by the Los Angeles Times, available exclusively to paper carriers, which covered Caltech's $600 annual tuition. Anson attended a sophomore analytical chemistry course of Ernest Swift and also carried out electroanalytical chemical research in his laboratory. He spent his summers working at Harshaw Chemical Company, located near East Los Angeles.

Anson played for Caltech's basketball team for three years, and was the senior captain of the 1954 team, which secured the Southern California Intercollegiate Athletic Conference (SCIAC) championship.

Anson received his bachelors at Caltech in 1954, PhD at Harvard University in 1957, and worked in J. J. Lingane's research group with Allen Bard. Anson later worked at his Alma mater Caltech for the next 43 years.

== Career ==
Anson completed a doctoral degree in chemistry from Harvard University in 1957, after which he returned to Caltech the same year as an instructor in the chemistry department.

=== Research ===
Anson's area of research span chemical kinetics, mechanisms and catalysis of electrode reactions.

Anson's initial studies focused on examining the electrochemical interactions of reactants bound to electrode surfaces. In the mid 1960s, he developed a method of using chronocoulometry to study electrode-attached reactants, presenting data in a format that would later become known as an Anson plot. In the mid-1960s, he created a technique utilizing chronocoulometry to analyze reactants attached to electrodes, presenting the results in a format that would later be referred to as an Anson plot. From 1970s to 90s, he investigated numerous surface-attached systems and was among the firsts in using thin polymer films to confine reactants at electrode surfaces. He also contributed to the understanding of electrocatalytic oxygen reduction.

=== Legacy ===
The National Academy of Sciences states that "Among his numerous impactful studies, he elucidated the electrochemistry of heteropolymetallates and catalysts for the electroreduction of dioxygen to water", a reaction occurring at the cathode of a fuel cell.

Throughout his career, Anson received numerous prestigious awards, including:

- The David C. Grahame Award of the Electrochemical Society (the inaugural recipient)
- The C.N. Reilley Award in Electroanalytical Chemistry (1986)
- The American Chemical Society Award in Analytical Chemistry (1989)
- The Humboldt Research Award (1984), which enabled him to conduct research in Berlin

Anson was awarded a Guggenheim fellowship, and was a member of National Academy of Sciences and American Academy of Arts and Sciences. He was inducted into the National Academy of Sciences alongside neuroscientist Eugene Roberts in 1988.

=== Other work ===
Anson, along with others, founded the Western Electrochemical and Technical Society, which held casual meetings to discuss electrochemistry on the beach in San Clemente. This group eventually turned into the Gordon Research Conference on Electrochemistry.

Anson chaired the search committee for Caltech's next president for a year and a half. After an year and half, the committee selected Marvin L. Goldberger as the president.

Anson was chairman of the faculty for two years, then became division chair for CCE in 1984.

== Personal life ==
After Anson joined Caltech as an instructor in 1957, he felt that it was necessary to get an interlibrary loan, for which he was directed to meet Roxana, who worked in what was then the General Library. They married later in 1959.
