= Veniamin Levich =

Ukrainian physicist (1917–1988)

Veniamin Grigorievich (Benjamin) Levich
- Вениамин Григорьевич Левич
- Born: 30 March 1917; Kharkiv, Ukraine
- Died: 19 January 1987 (aged 69); Englewood, New Jersey, United States
- Education: Sc.D., Physics and Mathematics
- Alma mater: University of Kharkiv
- Known for: Landau–Levich problem Levich equation
- Scientific career
- Fields: physical chemistry

Veniamin Grigorievich (Benjamin) Levich (Russian: Вениами́н Григо́рьевич Ле́вич; 30 March 1917 – 19 January 1987) was a Soviet dissident who was an internationally prominent physical chemist, electrochemist, and founder of the discipline of physico-chemical hydrodynamics. He was a student of the theoretical physicist, Lev Landau. His landmark textbook Physicochemical Hydrodynamics is widely considered his most important contribution to science. The Levich equation describing a current at a rotating disk electrode is named after him. His research activities also included gas-phase collision reactions, electrochemistry, and the quantum mechanics of electron transfer.

Levich received many honors during his life, including the Olin Palladium Award of The Electrochemical Society in 1973. He was elected a foreign member of the Norwegian Academy of Sciences in 1977 and a foreign associate of the U.S. National Academy of Engineering in 1982. He was also a member of numerous scientific organizations, although on leaving the USSR in 1978 he had to relinquish his Soviet citizenship and, therefore, was expelled from the USSR Academy of Sciences. An interdisciplinary institute at the City College of New York is named in his honor. His son Eugene V. (Yevgeny) Levich also became a physicist, leaving the Soviet Union in 1975 and raising support for other family members.

== See also ==
- Levich constant
- Levich equation
- Landau–Levich problem
- Koutecký–Levich equation
- Induced-charge electrokinetics
