= Hydrodynamic voltammetry =

Method of chemical analysis

In analytical chemistry, hydrodynamic voltammetry is a form of voltammetry in which the analyte solution flows relative to a working electrode. In many voltammetry techniques, the solution is intentionally left still to allow diffusion-controlled mass transfer. When a solution is made to flow, through stirring or some other physical mechanism, it is very important to the technique to achieve a very controlled flux or mass transfer in order to obtain predictable results. These methods are types of electrochemical studies which use potentiostats to investigate reaction mechanisms related to redox chemistry among other chemical phenomenon.

== Structure ==
Most experiments involve a three electrode setup but the setup configuration varies widely. All cell configurations create a laminar flow of solution across the working electrode(s) producing a steady-state current determined by solution flow rather than diffusion. The resulting current can be mathematically predicted and modeled. Among the most common hydrodynamic setup involves the working electrodes rotating to create a laminar flow of solution across the electrode surface. Both rotating disk electrodes (RDE) and rotating ring-disk electrodes (RRDE) are examples where the working electrode rotates. Other configurations, such as flow cells, use pumps to direct solution at or across the working electrode(s).

== Distinction ==
Hydrodynamic techniques are distinct from still and unstirred experiments such as cyclic voltammetry where the steady-state current is limited by the diffusion of substrate. Experiments are not however limited to linear sweep voltammetry. The configuration of many cells takes the substrate from one working electrode across another, RRDE for example. The potential of one electrode can be varied as the other is held constant or varied. The flow rate can also be varied to adjust the temporal gap the substrates experiences between working electrodes.

== See also ==
- Linear sweep voltammetry
- Rotating disk electrode
- Rotating ring-disk electrode
