= Wiktor Kemula =

Polish chemist, electrochemist, and polarographist

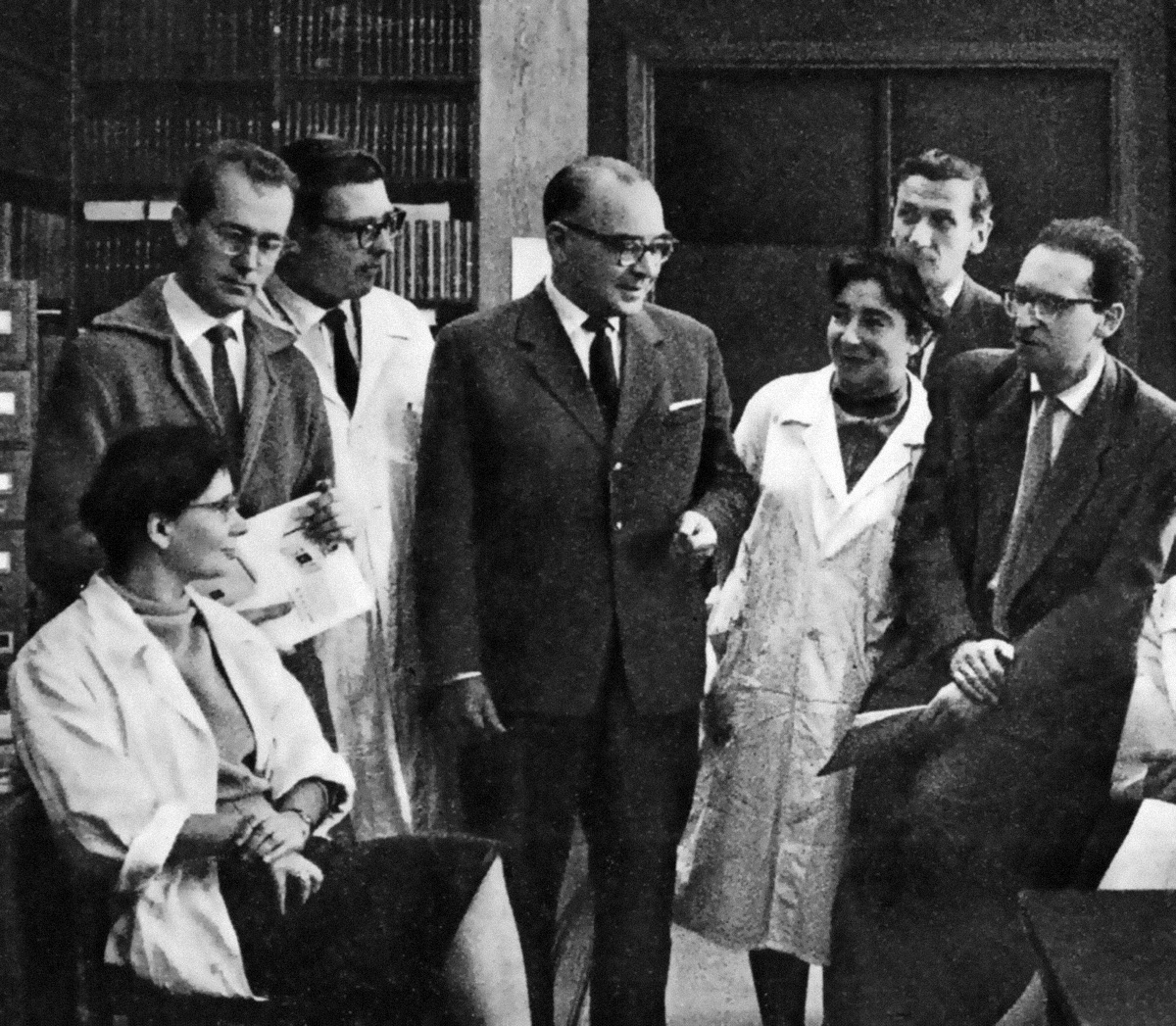
- Kemula (middle) in 1963
- Born: November 6, 1902; Izmail, Russian Empire
- Died: October 17, 1985 (aged 82); Warsaw, Poland
- Education: Lviv University; University of Warsaw
- Known for: hanging mercury drop electrode (HDME)
- Awards: Centenary Prize (1965)
- Scientific career
- Fields: Chemistry; Electrochemistry; Polarography
- Workplaces: University of Warsaw

Wiktor Kemula (November 6, 1902, in Izmail – October 17, 1985, in Warsaw) was a Polish chemist, electrochemist, and polarographist. He greatly contributed to the development of electroanalytical chemistry, particularly polarography. He is known for developing the hanging mercury drop electrode (HMDE).

== Life and career ==
He was born in 1902 in Izmail, Russian Empire (present-day Ukraine). In 1921, he graduated with honours from secondary school in Izmail and enrolled at the Jan Kzimierz University in Lwów to study chemistry. Between 1929 and 1930, he was on a scholarship at the Charles University in Prague where he studied under Jaroslav Heyrovský and in 1930–1931 he was in Leipzig where he studied under Peter Debye and Fritz Weigert. In the years 1936–1941, he was Professor of Physical Chemistry at the Jan Kazimierz University. In 1936, he became a member of the Lwów Scientific Society.

In the period of Soviet occupation of Lviv, he continued his scientific research in the city and taught chemistry at the secret Jan Kazimierz University.

In 1945, he became a professor at the University of Warsaw. In 1955, he was elected president of the Polish Chemical Society. In 1961, he became a full member of the Polish Academy of Sciences (PAN).

He invented the hanging mercury drop electrode (HDME) and contributed to the development of electroanalytical chemistry, especially polarography. In 1965, he was awarded the Centenary Prize by the Royal Society of Chemistry (RSC).

Between 1981 and 1985, he served as head of the Warsaw Scientific Society (Polish: Towarzystwo Naukowe Warszawskie). In 1982, he received an honorary doctorate from the University of Warsaw.

== See also ==
- List of Polish chemists
- Timeline of Polish science and technology
