= Electrocapillarity =

Physical phenomenon

If an electric field is applied parallel to the surface of a liquid and this surface has a net charge then the surface and so the liquid will move in response to the field. This is electrocapillary flow, an example of electrocapillarity. Electrocapillary phenomena are phenomena related to changes in the surface free energy (or interfacial tension) of charged fluid interfaces, for example that of the dropping mercury electrode (DME), or in principle, any electrode, as the electrode potential changes or the electrolytic solution composition and concentration change.

The term electrocapillary is used to describe the change in mercury (Hg) electrode potential as a function of the change in the surface or interfacial tension of the Hg determined by the capillary rise method. The phenomena are the historic main contributions for understanding and validating the models of the structure of the electrical double layer. The phenomena are related to the electrokinetic phenomena and consequently to the colloid chemistry.

== Interfacial tension ==
The interfacial (surface) tension, St, (dyne cm^{−1}), can be calculated by applying the equation of capillary rise method (when the contact angle Ө → 0):

$St = \frac{h \cdot r \cdot g \cdot d}{2}$

where:

- h (cm) is the height of Hg column above the Hg meniscus in the capillary
- r (cm) is the radius of capillary
- g is the acceleration due to gravity
- d (g cm^{−3}) is the Hg density

The circuit contains Hg electrode as the ideally polarizable electrode and a reference electrode as the non-polarizable electrode. Thus, when an external voltage is applied, only EM/S of Hg/solution fluid interface is changed.

== See also ==
- Colloid chemistry
- Electrical double layer
- Electrokinetic phenomena
- Liquid metal electrode
- Rotating disk electrode
