= Hard carbon =

Solid form of carbon

Hard carbon is a solid form of carbon that cannot be converted to graphite by heat treatment, even at temperatures as high as 3000 °C. It is also known as char, or non-graphitizing carbon. More colloquially it can be described as charcoal.

Hard carbon is produced by heating carbonaceous precursors to approximately 1000 °C in the absence of oxygen. Among the precursors for hard carbon are polyvinylidene chloride (PVDC), lignin and sucrose. Other precursors, such as polyvinyl chloride (PVC) and petroleum coke, produce soft carbon, or graphitizing carbon. Soft carbon can be readily converted to graphite by heating to 3000 °C.

The physical properties of the two classes of carbons are quite different. Hard carbon is a low density material, with extremely high microporosity, while soft carbon has little microporosity. Hard carbon is extensively used as anode materials in lithium-ion batteries, especially to hold back the pressure from the intercalation of lithium ions. This properties are also suitable for sodium-ion batteries. where graphite anodes cannot be used because of the larger size of the sodium ion.

Manufacturers of hard carbon include Xiamen Tob New Energy (China), Kuraray (Japan) and Stora Enso (Finland).

== See also ==
- Carbon
- Graphitizing and non-graphitizing carbons
- Carbonization
- Graphite
