= Anson equation =

In electrochemistry, the Anson equation defines the charge-time dependence for linear diffusion control in chronocoulometry.

The Anson equation is written as:

$$Q = 2nFACD^{1/2}\pi^{-1/2}t^{1/2}$$

where,

Q = charge in coulombs
n = number of electrons (to reduce/oxidize one molecule of analyte)
F = Faraday constant, 96485 C/mol
A = area of the (planar) electrode in cm^{2}
C = concentration in mol/cm^{3};
D = diffusion coefficient in cm^{2}/s
t = time in s.

This is related to the Cottrell equation via integration with respect to time (t), and similarly implies that the electrode is planar.

== See also ==
- Voltammetry
- Electroanalytical methods
- Limiting current
- Cottrell equation
