= Dionýz Ilkovič =

Czechoslovak physicist and physical chemist of Rusyn ethnicity

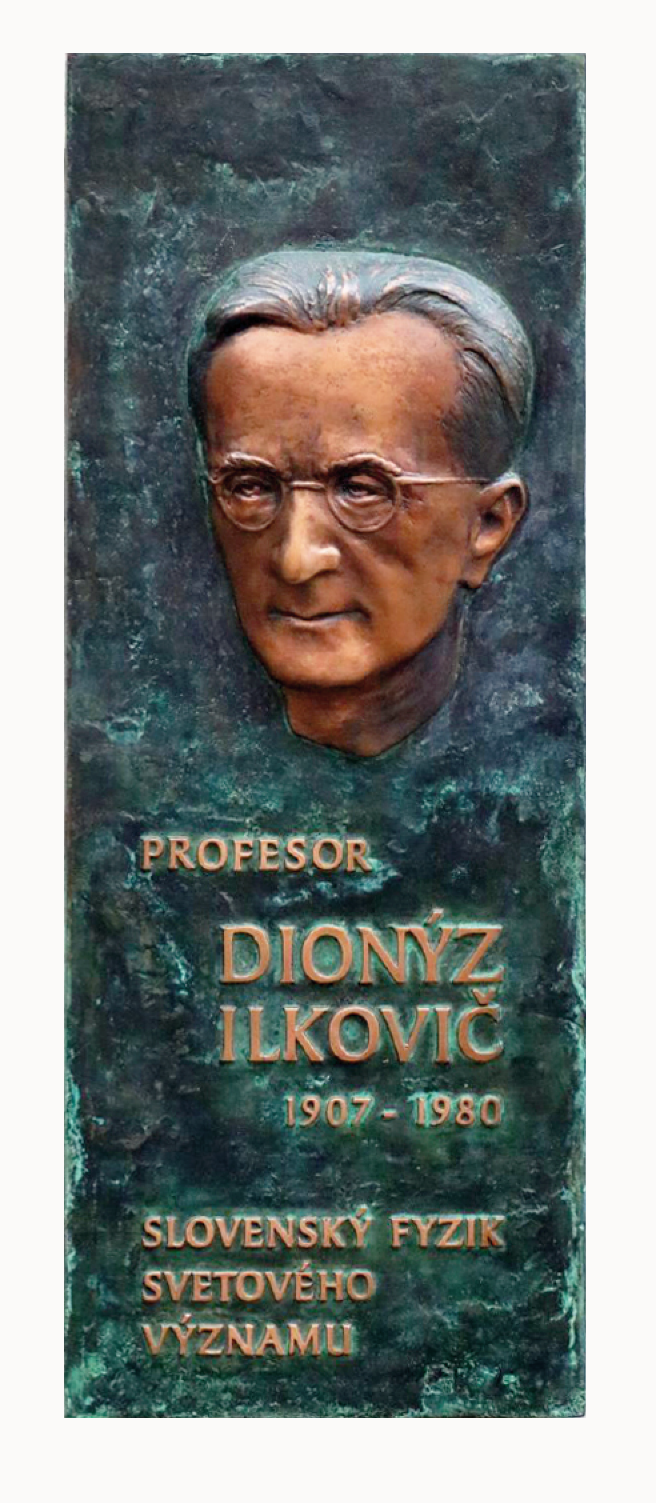
- Born: 18 January 1907; Šarišský Štiavnik, Hungary, Austria-Hungary (now Slovakia)
- Died: 4 August 1980 (aged 73); Bratislava, Czechoslovakia (now Slovakia)
- Education: Charles University in Prague
- Scientific career
- Fields: Physicist, Physical Chemist
- Workplaces: Slovak University of Technology in Bratislava

Dionýz Ilkovič (18 January 1907 – 3 August 1980) was a Czechoslovak physicist and physical chemist of Rusyn ethnicity. Along with Nobel laureate Jaroslav Heyrovský, he helped to establish theoretical basis of polarography. In this field, he is the author of an important result, the Ilkovic's equation. He was also one of the leading figures in modern university-level physics education in Slovakia.
