= Diffusion layer =

In electrochemistry, region surrounding an electrode in solution

In electrochemistry, the diffusion layer, according to IUPAC, is defined as the "region in the vicinity of an electrode where the concentrations are different from their value in the bulk solution. The definition of the thickness of the diffusion layer is arbitrary because the concentration approaches asymptotically the value in the bulk solution". The diffusion layer thus depends on the diffusion coefficient (D) of the analyte and, for voltammetric measurements, on the scan rate (V/s). It is usually considered to be some multiple of $\sqrt{Dt}$ (where $\tfrac 1 t$ = scan rate).

The value is physically relevant since the concentration of solute varies according to the expression derived from Fick's laws:

$\frac{c}{c*}=\operatorname{erf}\left(\frac{x}{2\sqrt{Dt}}\right)$

where erf is the error function. When $x=\sqrt{Dt},$ the concentration is approximately 52% of the bulk concentration:

$\operatorname{erf}(1/2)=0.520499878\dots$

At slow scan rates, the diffusion layer is large, on the order of micrometers, whereas at fast scan rates the diffusion layer is nanometers in thickness. The relationship is described in part by the Cottrell equation.

Relevant to cyclic voltammetry, the diffusion layer has negligible volume compared the volume of the bulk solution. For this reason, cyclic voltammetry experiments have an inexhaustible supply of fresh analyte.

The diffusion layer should not be confused with the similar-sounding diffuse layer, which is generally much thinner than the diffusion layer and also exists even at equilibrium. The diffuse layer arises from electrostatics and its thickness is governed by the Debye length, whereas the diffusion layer arises from driven (non-equilibrium) flows of solutes and its thickness is governed by diffusion (as above) or convection.
