= Levich constant =

A Levich constant (B) is often used in order to simplify the Levich equation. Furthermore, B is readily extracted from rotating disk electrode experimental data.

The B can be defined as:

$B= (0.620) n F A D^\frac{2}{3}v^\frac{-1}{6}C$

where

- n is the number of moles of electrons transferred in the half reaction (number)
- F is the Faraday constant (C/mol)
- A is the electrode area (cm^{2})
- D is the diffusion coefficient (see Fick's law of diffusion) (cm^{2}/s)
- v is the kinematic viscosity (cm^{2}/s)
- C is the analyte concentration (mol/cm^{3})
