= Eugene Roberts (neuroscientist) =

American neuroscientist (1920–2016)

Eugene Roberts (January 19, 1920 – November 8, 2016) was an American neuroscientist. In 1950, he was the first to report on the discovery of gamma-Aminobutyric acid (GABA) in the brain, and his work was key in demonstrating GABA as the main inhibitory neurotransmitter in the mammalian central nervous system.

== Early life ==
He was born Evgeny Rabinowitch in Krasnodar, USSR on 19 January 1920, and arrived in his parents to Detroit, Michigan, with his parents in 1922. Roberts received a B.S. degree in chemistry, magna cum laude from Wayne State University and a M.S. and Ph.D. degrees in 1941 and 1943, respectively, at the University of Michigan.

== Career ==
Roberts' later research focused on the role of gamma-aminobutyric acid (GABA) in brain development, normal brain function and neurological disease, and he helped pioneer immunohistochemical approaches for localizing GABAergic neurons using antibodies to glutamic acid decarboxylase. Since 1988, he was a member of the National Academy of Sciences (Cellular and molecular neuroscience), and was based at the City of Hope National Medical Center. He was inducted into the National Academy of Sciences alongside chemist Fred C. Anson in 1988.

== Commitment to science education ==
Roberts and his wife, Ruth, organized a student research program at the City of Hope National Medical Center in 1960. In its first year, two students enrolled. This academy continues to exist as the Eugene and Ruth Roberts Summer Student Academy based in Duarte, California, and has since educated over 1,500 high school and undergraduate students.

== Death ==
Roberts died on November 8, 2016, aged 96.
