= Randles–Sevcik equation =

Equation used in cyclic voltammetry

In electrochemistry, the Randles–Ševčík equation describes the effect of scan rate on the peak current (i_{p}) for a cyclic voltammetry experiment. For simple redox events where the reaction is electrochemically reversible, and the products and reactants are both soluble, such as the ferrocene/ferrocenium couple, i_{p} depends not only on the concentration and diffusional properties of the electroactive species but also on scan rate.

$$i_p = 0.4463 \ nFAC \left(\frac{nFvD}{RT}\right)^{\frac{1}{2}}$$

Or if the solution is at 25 °C:

$$i_p = 2.69\times  10^{5} \ n^{3/2} A C\sqrt{Dv}$$

- i_{p} = current maximum in amps
- n = number of electrons transferred in the redox event (usually 1)
- A = electrode area in cm^{2}
- F = Faraday constant in C mol^{−1}
- D = diffusion coefficient in cm^{2}/s
- C = concentration in mol/cm^{3}
- ν = scan rate in V/s
- R = Gas constant in J K^{−1} mol^{−1}
- T = temperature in K
- The constant with a value of 2.69×10^{5} has units of C mol^{−1} V^{−1/2}

For novices in electrochemistry, the predictions of this equation appear counter-intuitive, i.e. that i_{p} increases at faster voltage scan rates. It is important to remember that current, i, is charge (or electrons passed) per unit time. In cyclic voltammetry, the current passing through the electrode is limited by the diffusion of species to the electrode surface. This diffusion flux is influenced by the concentration gradient near the electrode. The concentration gradient, in turn, is affected by the concentration of species at the electrode, and how fast the species can diffuse through solution. By changing the cell voltage, the concentration of the species at the electrode surface is also changed, as set by the Nernst equation. Therefore, a faster voltage sweep causes a larger concentration gradient near the electrode, resulting in a higher current.

== Derivation ==
This equation is derived using the following governing equations and initial/boundary conditions:

$\frac {\partial C_O}{\partial t}=-D_O \frac{\partial C_O^{2}}{\partial x^{2}}$

$C_O(x,0) = C_O^*$

$\lim_{x \rightarrow \infty} C_O(x,t) = C_{O}^{*}$

$\frac {\partial C_R}{\partial t}=-D_R \frac{\partial C_R^{2}}{\partial x^{2}}$

$C_R(x,0) = C_R^*$

$\lim_{x \rightarrow \infty} C_R(x,t) = C_{R}^{*}$

$D_O \left( \frac {\partial C_O}{\partial x}\right)_{x=0} + D_R \left( \frac {\partial C_R}{\partial x}\right)_{x=0} = 0$

$E = E_i + vt = E^{0'} + \frac {RT}{nF}ln \left(\frac {C_O(0,t)}{C_R(0,t)}\right)$

- $x$ = distance from a planar electrode in cm
- $t$ = time in seconds
- $E$ = the potential of the electrode in volts
- $E_i$ = the initial potential of the electrode in volts
- $E^{0'}$ = the formal potential for the reaction between the oxidized ($O$) and reduced ($R$) species

== Uses ==
Using the relationships defined by this equation, the diffusion coefficient of the electroactive species can be determined. Linear plots of i_{p} vs. ν^{1/2} and peak potentials (E_{p}) that are not dependent on ν provide evidence for an electrochemically reversible redox process. For species where the diffusion coefficient is known (or can be estimated), the slope of the plot of i_{p} vs. ν^{1/2} provides information into the stoichiometry of the redox process, the concentration of the analyte, the area of the electrode, etc.

A more general investigation method is the plot of the peak currents as function of the scan rate on a logarithmically scaled x-axis. Deviations become easily detectable and the more general fit formula

$$j_{max}^{\,ox,red} = j_{0} + A\cdot \bigg( \frac{scan\, rate}{mV/s} \bigg)^{x}$$

can be used.

In this equation $j_0{}$ is the current at zero scan rate at the equilibrium potential $E_{0}$. In the electrochemical lab experiment $j_0{}$ may be small but can nowadays easily be monitored with a modern equipment. For example corrosion processes may lead to a not vanishing but still detectable $j_0{}$. When $j_{0}<< A$ and x is close to 0.5 a reaction mechanism according to Randles Sevcik can be assigned.

An example for this kind of reaction mechanism is the redox reaction of $\mathrm{Fe^{3+} / Fe^{2+} }$ species as an analyte (concentration 5mM each species) in a highly concentrated (1M) background solution $\mathrm{KNO_{3}}$ on graphite electrode.

Oxidation and reduction peak currents as function of the scan rate (x-axis, logarithmically scaled). Details as cyclic voltammogramms in Cyclic voltammetry. Data on GitHub

A more detailed plot with all fit parameters can be seen here.

== See also ==
- Berzins-Delahay equation
- Online calculator for use of Randles–Sevcik equation:http://www.calctool.org/CALC/chem/electrochem/cv1
