= Berzins-Delahay equation =

Electrochemical equation

In electrochemistry, the Berzins-Delahay equation is analogous to the Randles–Sevcik equation, except that it predicts the peak height ($i_p$) of a linear potential scan when the reaction is electrochemically reversible, the reactants are soluble, and the products are deposited on the electrode with a thermodynamic activity of one.

$i_p = 0.6105AC\sqrt{\frac{(nF)^3Dv}{RT}}$

- $A$ = electrode surface area in cm^{2}
- $C$ = concentration of the reactant in mol/cm^{3}
- $n$ = stoichiometric number of electrons exchanged in equivalents/mol
- $F$ = Faraday constant in C/equivalent
- $D$ = Diffusion coefficient of the reactant in cm^{2}/s
- $v$ = scan rate in V/s
- $R$ = Gas constant in J/molK
- $T$ = temperature in K

Despite the fact that this equation is derived under very simplistic assumptions, considering the complex phenomenon of nucleation, the Berzins-Delahay equation often makes good predictions of $i_p$. This is likely because nucleation processes have been resolved at this point, meaning that the fundamental assumptions of the derivation match the physical phenomena well. Corrections for these errant assumptions are available.

== Derivation ==
This equation is derived using the following governing equations and initial/boundary conditions:

$\frac{\partial C}{\partial t} = -D \frac{\partial^2 C}{\partial x^2}$

$C(x,0)=C^*$

$\lim_{x\rightarrow\infty}C(x,t)=C^*$

$E=E_i +vt = E^{0'} + \frac{RT}{nF}\ln\left(\frac{C(0,t)}{C^0}\right)$

- $t$ = time in s
- $x$ = distance from planar electrode in cm
- $E$ = the potential of the electrode in V
- $E_i$ = the initial potential of the electrode in V
- $E^{0'}$ = the formal potential for the reaction in V
- $C^0$ = a reference concentration of 1 mol/L or 1 mmol/cm^{3}

== Uses ==
The Berzins-Delahay equation is primarily used to measure the concentration or the diffusion coefficient of an analyte that participates in a reversible, deposition electrochemical reaction. To validate the application of this equation, one typically checks for a linear relationship between $i_p$ and $\sqrt{v}$ and peak potentials ($E_p$) that are independent of $v$. The characteristic shape of a deposition voltammogram, with a sharp reduction (negative current) with a decaying tail and a large oxidation peak that quickly decays to zero current, is also required to verify the reaction has soluble reactants and deposited products.
