= Polarograph =

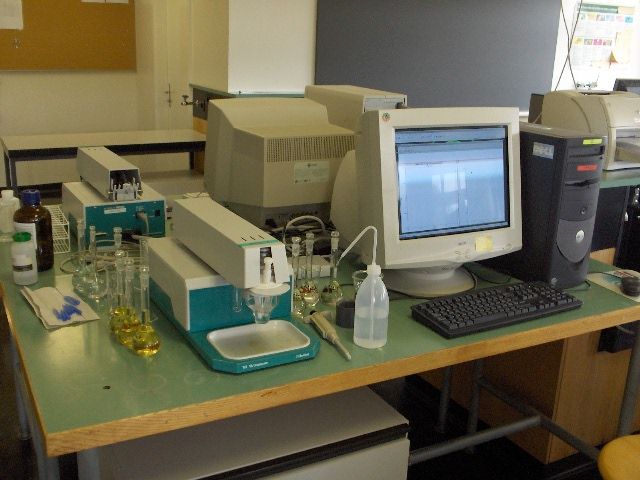
Workplace with Polarograph on the left

A Polarograph is a chemical analysis instrument used to record automatic voltage-intensity curves.

The Polarograph uses an electrolytic cell consisting of an electrode of microelectrode small area, generally of the mercury drop type, which is a very fine capillary tube through which mercury flows slowly, which comes in the form of small droplets, which fall on the same surface of a much broader element, which is the other electrode . When one applies a variable voltage in this cell, the electrode's large area remains unchanged, while the microelectrode undergoes a change of potential, ( i.e. is polarized). It also has a potentiometer coupled to the motor that moves the recording paper so that a certain voltage variation corresponds to a constant length of recording paper, and a galvanometer suitable for measuring the intensity of the electric current, whose response is transmitted to the actuator that moves the needle of the recorder. The technique used is called polarography. The Czech chemist and Nobel Prize winner Jaroslav Heyrovský invented it.
