= Polarography =

Method of chemical analysis

Polarography is a type of voltammetry where the working electrode is a dropping mercury electrode (DME) or a static mercury drop electrode (SMDE), which are useful for their wide cathodic ranges and renewable surfaces. It was invented in 1922 by Czechoslovak chemist Jaroslav Heyrovský, for which he won the Nobel prize in 1959. The main advantages of mercury as electrode material are as follows: 1) a large voltage window: ca. from +0.2 V to -1.8 V vs reversible hydrogen electrode (RHE). Hg electrode is particularly well-suited for studying electroreduction reactions. 2) very reproducible electrode surface, since mercury is liquid. 3) very easy cleaning of the electrode surface by making a new drop of mercury from a large Hg pool connected by a glass capillary.

Polarography played a major role as an experimental tool in the advancement of both Analytical Chemistry and Electrochemistry until the 1990s (see figure below), when it was supplanted by other methods that did not require the use of mercury.

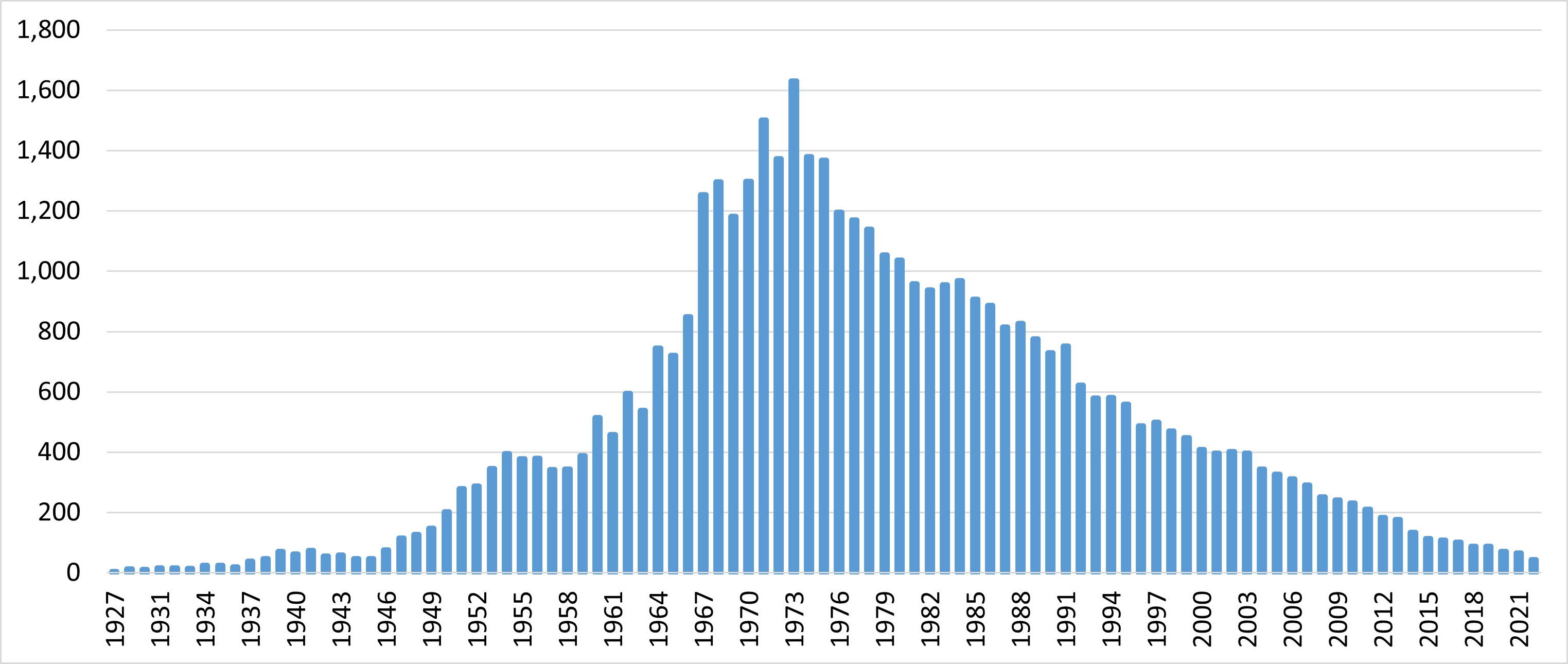
The number of publications (journal articles comprise ca. 42,000 out 45,468, patent count is only 992) about polarography according to SciFinderN database on 2023-01-18.

== Principle of operation ==
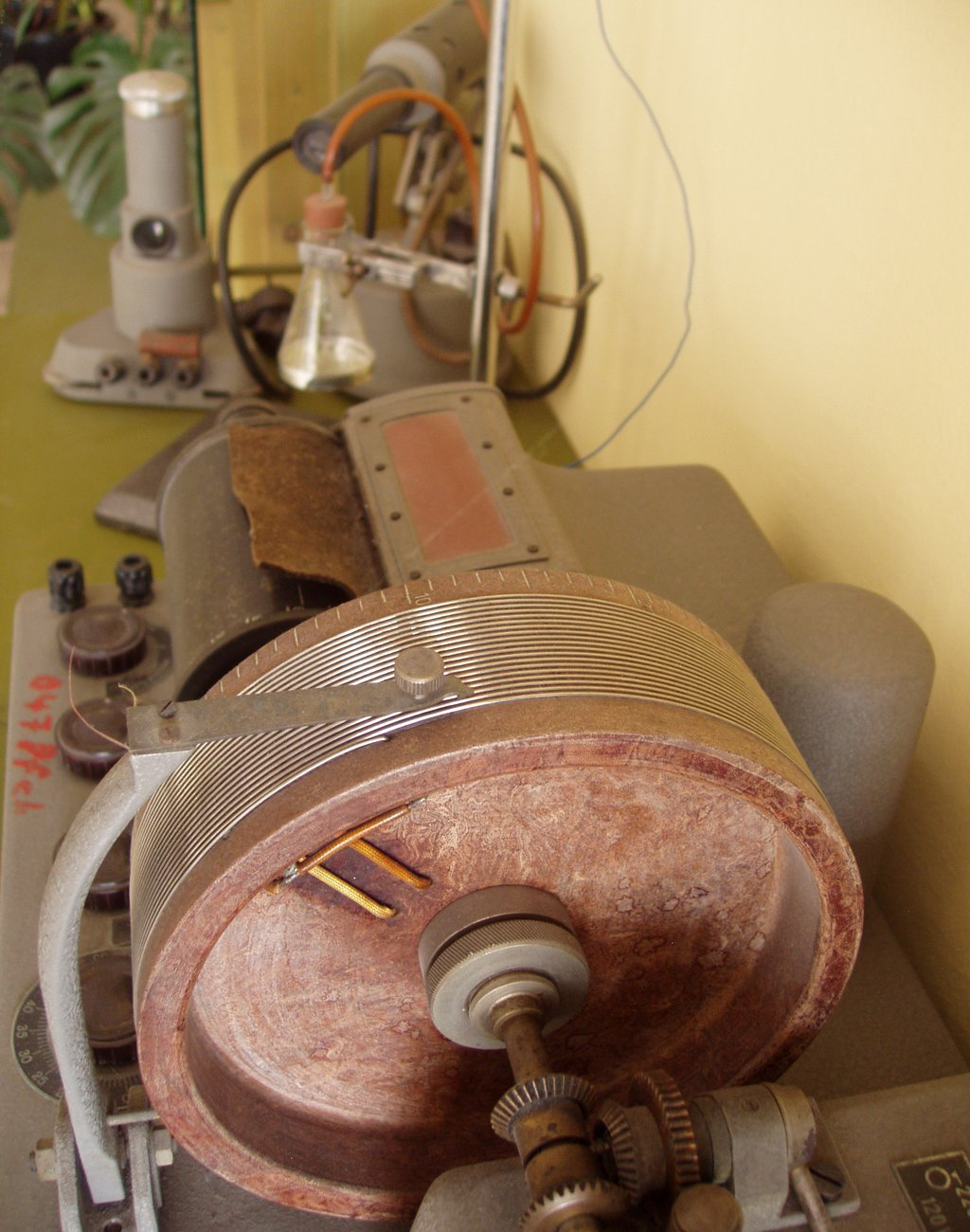
Heyrovský's Polarograph

Polarography is an electrochemical voltammetric technique that employs (dropping or static) mercury drop as a working electrode. In its most simple form polarography can be used to determine concentrations of electroactive species in liquids by measuring their mass-transport limiting currents. In such an experiment the potential of the working mercury drop electrode is linearly changed in time, and the electrode current is recorded at a certain time just before the mercury drop dislodges from a glass capillary from where the stream of mercury emerges. A plot of the current vs. potential in a polarography experiment shows the current oscillations corresponding to the drops of Hg falling from the capillary. If the maximum currents of each drop were connected, a sigmoidal shape would result. The limiting current (the plateau on the sigmoid), is called the diffusion-limited current because diffusion is the principal contribution to the flux of the electroactive material at this point of the Hg drop life. More advanced varieties of polarography (see below) produce peaks (which allow for a better resolution of different chemical species) rather than the waves of classical polarography, and improve the detection limits, which in some cases can be as low as 10^-9 M.

== Limitations ==
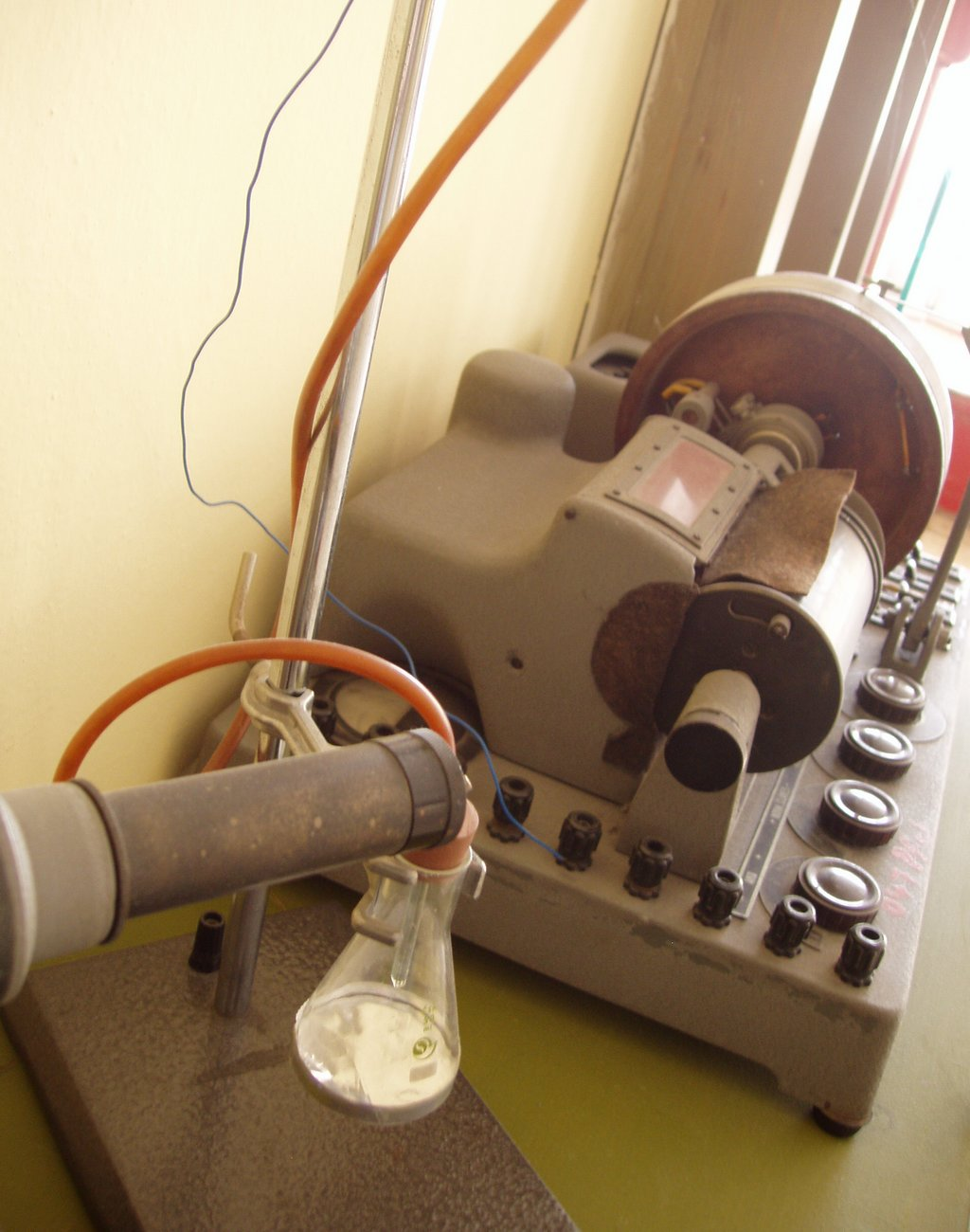
Heyrovský's Polarograph and DME

There are limitations in particular for the classical polarography experiment for quantitative analytical measurements. Because the current is continuously measured during the growth of the Hg drop, there is a substantial contribution from capacitive current. As the Hg flows from the capillary end, there is initially a large increase in the surface area. As a consequence, the initial current is dominated by capacitive effects as charging of the rapidly increasing interface occurs. Toward the end of the drop life, there is little change in the surface area which diminishes the contribution of capacitance changes to the total current. At the same time, any redox process which occurs will result in faradaic current that decays approximately as the square root of time (due to the increasing dimensions of the Nernst diffusion layer). The exponential decay of the capacitive current is much more rapid than the decay of the faradaic current; hence, the faradaic current is proportionally larger at the end of the drop life. Unfortunately, this process is complicated by the continuously changing potential that is applied to the working electrode (the Hg drop) throughout the experiment. Because the potential changes during the drop lifetime (assuming typical experimental parameters of a 2 mV/s scan rate and a 4 s drop time, the potential can change by 8 mV from the beginning to the end of the drop), the charging of the interface (capacitive current) has a continuous contribution to the total current, even at the end of the drop when the surface area is not rapidly changing. As such, the typical signal to noise ratio of a polarographic experiment allows detection limits of only approximately 10^{−5} or 10^{−6} M.

== Improvements ==
Dramatically better discrimination against the capacitive current can be obtained using the tast and pulse polarographic techniques. These have been developed with the introduction of analogue and digital electronic potentiostats. The first major improvement was obtained by measuring the current only at the end of each drop lifetime (tast polarography). An even greater enhancement was the introduction of differential pulse polarography. Here, the current is measured before the beginning and before the end of short potential pulses. The latter are superimposed on the linear potential-time-function of the voltammetric scan. Typical amplitudes of these pulses range between 10 and 50 mV, whereas pulse duration is 20 to 50 ms. The difference between both current values is the analytical signal. This technique results in a 100 to 1000-fold improvement of the detection limit, because the capacitive component is effectively subtracted.

== Qualitative information ==
Qualitative information can also be determined from the half-wave potential of the polarogram (the current vs. potential plot in a polarographic experiment). The value of the half-wave potential is related to the standard potential for the redox reaction being studied.

This technique and especially the differential pulse anodic stripping voltammetry (DPASV) method can be used for environmental analysis, and especially for marine study for the characterisation of organic matter and metals interactions.

== Quantitative information ==
The Ilkovic equation is a relation used in polarography relating the diffusion current (I_{d}) and the concentration of the depolarizer (c), which is the substance reduced or oxidized at the dropping mercury electrode. The Ilkovic equation has the form

$$I_\text{d} = knD^{1/2} m_r^{2/3} t^{1/6} c$$

where:

- k is a constant which includes π and the density of mercury, and with the Faraday constant F has been evaluated at 708 for maximal current and 607 for average current
- D is the diffusion coefficient of the depolarizer in the medium (cm^{2}/s)
- n is the number of electrons exchanged in the electrode reaction, m is the mass flow rate of Hg through the capillary (mg/s)
- t is the drop lifetime in seconds,
- c is depolarizer concentration in mol/cm^{3}.

The equation is named after the scientist who derived it, the Slovak chemist Dionýz Ilkovič (1907–1980).

== See also ==
- Electroanalytical method
- Hanging mercury drop electrode
