= Rotating ring-disk electrode =

Double working electrode used for hydrodynamic voltammetry

In analytical chemistry, a rotating ring-disk electrode (RRDE) is a double working electrode used in hydrodynamic voltammetry, very similar to a rotating disk electrode (RDE). The electrode rotates during experiments inducing a flux of analyte to the electrode. This system used in electrochemical studies when investigating reaction mechanisms related to redox chemistry and other chemical phenomena.

== Structure ==
The difference between a rotating ring-disk electrode and a rotating disk electrode is the addition of a second working electrode in the form of a ring around the central disk of the first working electrode. To operate such an electrode, it is necessary to use a potentiostat, such as a bipotentiostat, capable of controlling a four-electrode system. The two electrodes are separated by a non-conductive barrier and connected to the potentiostat through different leads. This rotating hydrodynamic electrode motif can be extended to rotating double-ring electrodes, rotating double-ring-disk electrodes, and even more esoteric constructions, as suited to the experiment.

== Function ==
The RRDE takes advantage of the laminar flow created during rotation. As the system is rotated, the solution in contact with the electrode is driven to its side, similar to the situation of a rotating disk electrode. As the solution flows to the side, it crosses the ring electrode and flows back into the bulk solution. If the flow in the solution is laminar, the solution is brought in contact with the disk and with the ring quickly afterward, in a very controlled manner. The resulting currents depend on the potential, area, and spacing of the electrodes, as well as the rotation speed and the substrate.

This design makes a variety of experiments possible, for example a complex could be oxidized at the disk and then reduced back to the starting material at the ring. It is easy to predict what the ring/disk current ratios is if this process is entirely controlled by the flow of solution. If it is not controlled by the flow of the solution the current will deviate. For example, if the first oxidation is followed by a chemical reaction, an EC mechanism, to form a product that can not be reduced at the ring then the magnitude of the ring current would be reduced. By varying the rate of rotation it is possible to determine the rate of the chemical reaction if it is in the proper kinetic regime.

== Applications ==
The RRDE setup allows for many additional experiments well beyond the capacity of a RDE. For example, while one electrode conducts linear sweep voltammetry the other can be kept at a constant potential or also swept in a controlled manner. Step experiments with each electrode acting independently can be conducted. These as well as many other extremely elegant experiments are possible, including those tailored to the needs of a given system. Such experiments are useful in studying multi-electrons processes, the kinetics of a slow electron transfer, adsorption/desorption steps, and electrochemical reaction mechanisms.

The RRDE is an important tool for characterizing the fundamental properties of electrocatalysts used in fuel cells. For example, in a proton exchange membrane (PEM) fuel cell, dioxygen reduction at the cathode is often enhanced by an electrocatalyst comprising platinum nanoparticles. When oxygen is reduced using an electrocatalyst, an unwanted and harmful by-product, hydrogen peroxide, may be produced. Hydrogen peroxide can damage the internal components of a PEM fuel cell, so oxygen-reduction electrocatalysts are engineered in such a way as to limit the amount of peroxide formed. An RRDE "collection experiment" can be used to probe the peroxide generating tendencies of an electrocatalyst. In this experiment, the disk is coated with a thin layer bearing the electrocatalyst, and the disk electrode is poised at a potential which reduces the oxygen. Any products generated at the disk electrode are then swept past the ring electrode. The potential of the ring electrode is poised to detect any hydrogen peroxide that may have been generated at the disk.

== Design considerations ==
In general, narrowing the gap between the disk outer diameter and the ring inner diameter allows probing of systems with faster kinetics. A narrow gap reduces the "transit time" necessary for an intermediate species generated at the disk to successfully reach the ring electrode and be detected. Using precision machining techniques, it is possible to make gaps between 0.1 and 0.5 millimeters, and narrower gaps have been created using microlithography techniques.

Another important parameter for an RRDE is the "collection efficiency". This parameter is a measure of the percentage of the material generated at the disk electrode which is detected at the ring electrode. For any given set of RRDE dimensions (disk OD, ring ID, and ring OD), the collection efficiency can be computed using formulae derived from fluid dynamics first principles. One useful aspect of the theoretical collection efficiency is that it is only a function of the RRDE dimensions. That is, it is independent of the rotation rate over a wide range of rotation rates.

It is desirable for an RRDE to have a large collection efficiency if only to assure that the current signal measured at the ring electrode is detectable. On the other hand, it also desirable for an RRDE to have a small transit time so that short-lived (unstable) intermediate products generated at the disk survive long enough to be detected at the ring. The choice of actual RRDE dimensions is often a trade-off between a large collection efficiency or a short transit time.

== See also ==
- Hydrodynamic technique
- Liquid metal electrode
- Rotating disk electrode
- Voltammetry
- Working electrode
