= Graphitizing and non-graphitizing carbons =

Categories of carbon

Graphitizing and non-graphitizing carbons (alternatively graphitizable and non-graphitizable carbon) are the two categories of carbon produced by pyrolysis of organic materials. Rosalind Franklin first identified them in a 1951 paper in Proceedings of the Royal Society. In this paper, she defined graphitizing carbons as those that can transform into crystalline graphite by being heated to 3,000 °C (3,270 K; 5,430 °F), while non-graphitizing carbons do not transform into graphite at any temperature. Precursors that produce graphitizing carbon include polyvinyl chloride (PVC) and petroleum coke. Polyvinylidene chloride (PVDC) and sucrose produce non-graphitizing carbon. Physical properties of the two classes of carbons are quite different. Graphitizing carbons are soft and non-porous, while non-graphitizing carbons are hard, low density materials. Non-graphitizing carbons are otherwise known as chars, hard carbons or, more colloquially, charcoal. Glassy carbon, also known as vitreous carbon, is also an example of a non-graphitizing carbon material.

The precursors for graphitizing carbons pass through a fluid stage during pyrolysis (carbonization). This fluidity facilitates the molecular mobility of the aromatic molecules, resulting in intermolecular dehydrogenative polymerization reactions to create aromatic, lamellar (disc-like) molecules. These "associate" to create a new liquid crystal phase, the so-called mesophase. A fluid phase is the dominant requirement for production of graphitizable carbons.

Non-graphitizing carbons generally do not pass through a fluid stage during carbonization. Since the time of Rosalind Franklin, researchers have put forward a number of models for their structure. Oberlin and colleagues emphasised the role of basic structural units (BSU), made of planar aromatic structures consisting of less than 10–20 rings, with four layers or fewer. Cross-linking between the BSUs in non-graphitizing carbons prevents graphitization. More recently, some have put forward models that incorporate pentagons and other non-six-membered carbon rings.

== See also ==
- Acheson process
- Carbonization
- Graphite
