= Cottrell equation =

Equation in electrochemistry

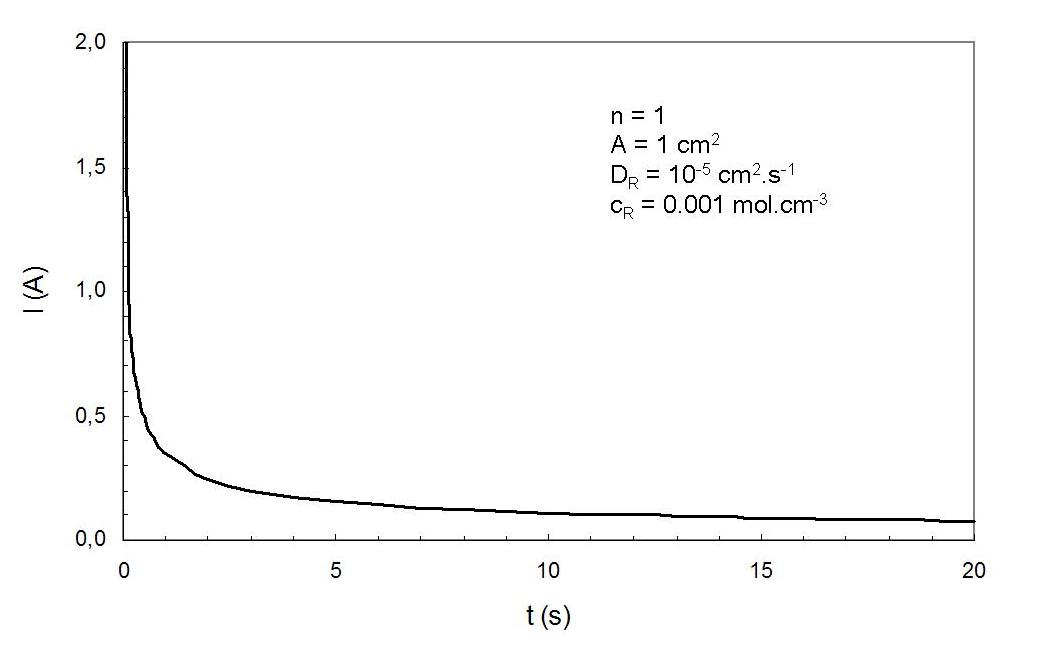
Variation of current density following the Cottrell equation

In electrochemistry, the Cottrell equation describes the change in electric current with respect to time in a controlled potential experiment, such as chronoamperometry. Specifically it describes the current response when the potential is a step function in time. It was derived by Frederick Gardner Cottrell in 1903. For a simple redox event, such as the ferrocene/ferrocenium couple, the current measured depends on the rate at which the analyte diffuses to the electrode. That is, the current is said to be "diffusion controlled". The Cottrell equation describes the case for an electrode that is planar but can also be derived for spherical, cylindrical, and rectangular geometries by using the corresponding Laplace operator and boundary conditions in conjunction with Fick's second law of diffusion.

$$i = \frac {nFAc_{j}^{0}\sqrt{D_{j}}}{\sqrt{\pi t}}$$

where,

i= current, in units of A
n = number of electrons (to reduce/oxidize one molecule of analyte j, for example)
F = Faraday constant, 96485 C/mol
A = area of the (planar) electrode in cm^{2}
$c_j^0$ = initial concentration of the reducible analyte $j$ in mol/cm^{3};
D_{j} = diffusion coefficient for species j in cm^{2}/s
t = time in s.

Deviations from linearity in the plot of i vs. t^{–1/2}sometimes indicate that the redox event is associated with other processes, such as association of a ligand, dissociation of a ligand, or a change in geometry. Deviations from linearity can be expected at very short time scales due to non-ideality in the potential step. At long time scales, buildup of the diffusion layer causes a shift from a linearly dominated to a radially dominated diffusion regime, which causes another deviation from linearity.

In practice, the Cottrell equation simplifies to $i = kt^{-1/2},$ where k is the collection of constants for a given system (n, F, A, $c_j^0$, D_{j}).

== See also ==
- Voltammetry
- Electroanalytical methods
- Limiting current
- Anson equation
