= Šarišský Štiavnik =

- Municipality
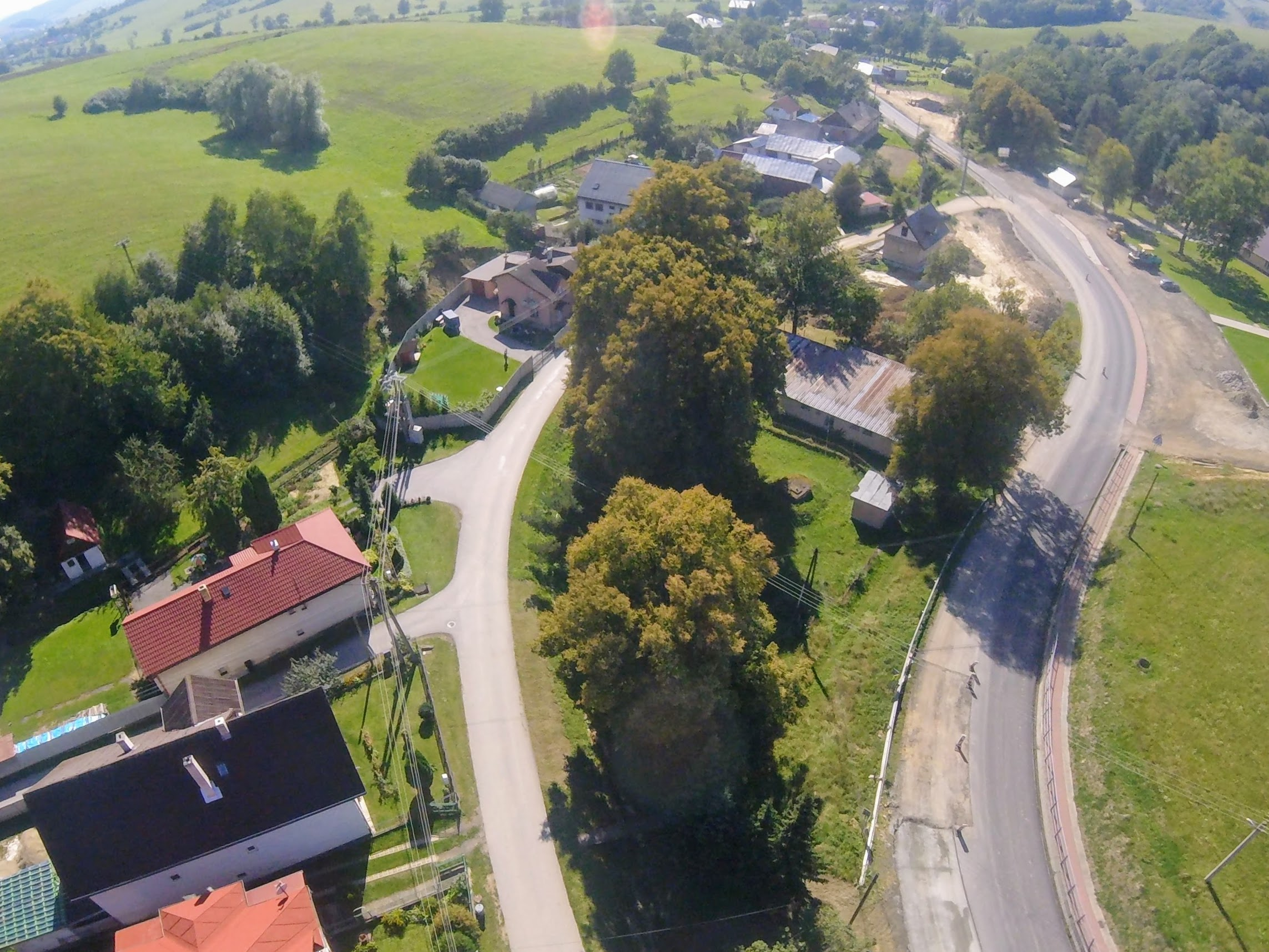

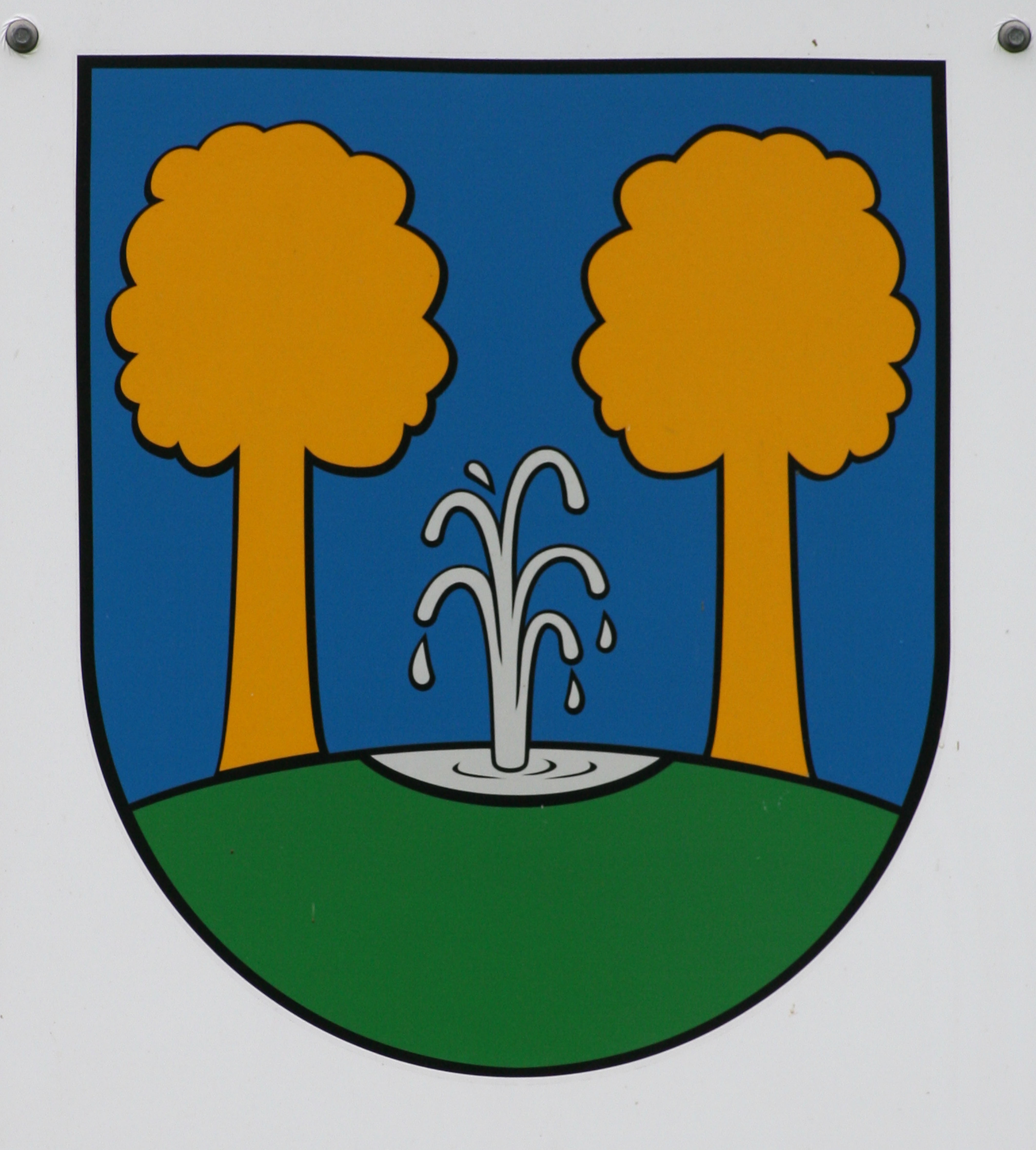
- Flag Coat of arms

- Location of Šarišský Štiavnik in the Prešov Region Location of Šarišský Štiavnik in Slovakia
- Coordinates: 49.23°N 21.57°E
- Country: Slovakia
- Region: Prešov Region
- District: Svidník District
- First mentioned: 1567

Area
  - Total: 5.27 km^{2} (2.03 sq mi)
- Elevation: 229 m (751 ft)

Population (2025)
  - Total: 244
- Time zone: UTC+1 (CET)
  - Summer (DST): UTC+2 (CEST)
- Postal code: 904 2
- Area code: +421 54
- Vehicle registration plate (until 2022): SK
- Website: www.sarisskystiavnik.sk

Šarišský Štiavnik (Hungarian: Sósfüred, until 1899: Scsavnyik) is a village in north-eastern Slovakia.

== History ==
In historical records the village was first mentioned in 1567.

== Geography ==
The municipality lies at an altitude of 229 metres (751 ft) and covers an area of 5.27 km^{2} (2.03 sq mi) (2025).

== Population ==
Population statistic (10 years)
Year	1995	2005	2015	2025
Count	262	288	292	244
Difference		+9.92%	+1.38%	−16.43%

Population statistic
Year	2024	2025
Count	248	244
Difference		−1.61%

It has a population of 244 people (31 December 2025).

=== Ethnicity ===
Census 2021 (1+ %)
Ethnicity	Number	Fraction
Slovak	227	85.98%
Rusyn	103	39.01%
Not found out	13	4.92%
Other	3	1.13%
Total	264	

In year 2021 was 264 people by ethnicity 227 as Slovak, 103 as Rusyn, 13 as Not found out, 3 as Other and 1 as Ukrainian.

Note on population: The difference values of population numbers in the table "Population statistic" and in the sections "Ethnicity" & "Religion" is caused by the use of various statistical methods.

=== Religion ===
Census 2021 (1+ %)
Religion	Number	Fraction
Greek Catholic Church	193	73.11%
Roman Catholic Church	37	14.02%
None	22	8.33%
Not found out	12	4.55%
Total	264	

In year 2021 was 264 people by religion 193 from Greek Catholic Church, 37 from Roman Catholic Church, 22 from None and 12 from Not found out.
