= Liquid metal electrode =

Electrode that uses a liquid metal

A liquid metal electrode is an electrode that uses a liquid metal, such as mercury, Galinstan, and NaK. They can be used in electrocapillarity, voltammetry, and impedance measurements. Liquid metal electrodes of mercury work also as catode in mercury-arc valves.

== Dropping mercury electrode ==
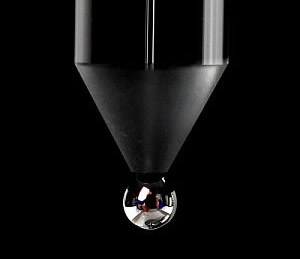
Dropping mercury electrode

The dropping mercury electrode (DME) is a working electrode made of mercury and used in polarography. Experiments run with mercury electrodes are referred to as forms of polarography even if the experiments are identical or very similar to a corresponding voltammetry experiment which uses solid working electrodes. Like other working electrodes these electrodes are used in electrochemical studies using three electrode systems when investigating reaction mechanisms related to redox chemistry among other chemical phenomena.

=== Structure ===
A flow of mercury passes through an insulating capillary producing a droplet which grows from the end of the capillary in a reproducible way. Each droplet grows until it reaches a diameter of about a millimeter and releases. The released droplet is no longer in contact with the working electrode whose contact is above the capillary. As the electrode is used mercury collects in the bottom of the cell. In some cell designs this mercury pool is connected to a lead and used as the cell's auxiliary electrode. Each released drop is immediately followed by the formation of another drop. The drops are generally produced at a rate of about 0.2 Hz.

=== Considerations ===
A major advantage of the DME is that each drop has a smooth and uncontaminated surface free from any adsorbed analyte or impurity. The self-renewing electrode does not need to be cleaned or polished like a solid electrode. This advantage comes at the cost of a working electrode with a constantly changing surface area. Since the drops are produced predictably the changing surface area can be accounted for or even used advantageously. In addition, the drops' growth causes more and more addition of capacitive current to the faradaic current. These changing current effects combined with experiments where the potential is continuously changed can result in noisy traces. In some experiments the traces are continually sampled, showing all the current deviation resulting from the drop growth. Other sampling methods smooth the data by sampling the current at the electrode only once per drop at a specific size. The DME's periodic expansion into the solution and hemispherical shape also affects the way the analyte diffuses to the electrode surface. The DME consists of a fine capillary with a bore size of 20–50 μm.

== Hanging mercury drop electrode ==
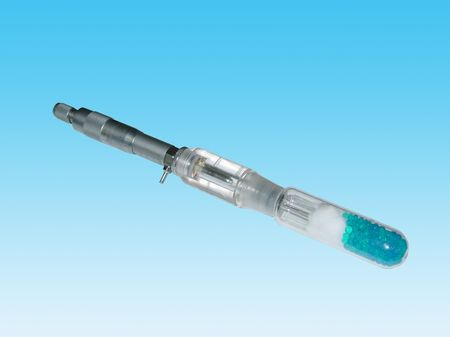
Hanging mercury drop electrode

The hanging mercury drop electrode (HMDE) is a working electrode variation on the dropping mercury electrode (DME). It was developed by Polish chemist Wiktor Kemula. Experiments run with dropping mercury electrodes are referred to as forms of polarography. If the experiments are performed at an electrode with a constant surface (like the HMDE) it is referred as voltammetry.

Like other working electrodes these electrodes are used in electrochemical studies using three electrode systems when investigating reaction mechanisms related to redox chemistry among other chemical phenomenon.

=== Distinction ===
The hanging mercury drop electrode produces a partial mercury drop of controlled geometry and surface area at the end of a capillary in contrast to the dropping mercury electrode which steadily releases drops of mercury during an experiment. The disadvantages a DME experiences due to a constantly changing surface are not experienced by the HMDE since it has static surface area during an experiment. The static surface of the HMDE means it is more likely to suffer from the surface adsorption phenomenon than a DME. Unlike solid electrodes which need to be cleaned and polished between most experiments, the self-renewing HMDE can simply release the contaminated drop and grow a clean drop between each experiment.

== See also ==
- Liquid rheostat
- Rotating disk electrode
- Rotating ring-disk electrode
- Rotating-anode X-ray tube
- Polarography
- Voltammetry
- Working electrode
