= Electrochemical reaction mechanism =

Sequence of steps by which an electrochemical reaction occurs

In electrochemistry, an electrochemical reaction mechanism is the step-by-step sequence of elementary steps, involving at least one outer-sphere electron transfer, by which an overall electrochemical reaction occurs.

== Overview ==
Elementary steps like proton coupled electron transfer and the movement of electrons between an electrode and substrate are special to electrochemical processes. Electrochemical mechanisms are important to all redox chemistry including corrosion, redox active photochemistry including photosynthesis, other biological systems often involving electron transport chains and other forms of homogeneous and heterogeneous electron transfer. Such reactions are most often studied with standard three electrode techniques such as cyclic voltammetry(CV), chronoamperometry, and bulk electrolysis as well as more complex experiments involving rotating disk electrodes and rotating ring-disk electrodes. In the case of photoinduced electron transfer the use of time-resolved spectroscopy is common.

== Formalism ==
When describing electrochemical reactions an "E" and "C" formalism is often employed. The E represents an electron transfer; sometimes E_{O} and E_{R} are used to represent oxidations and reductions respectively. The C represents a chemical reaction which can be any elementary reaction step and is often called a "following" reaction. In coordination chemistry common C steps which "follow" electron transfer are ligand loss and association. The ligand loss or gain is associated with a geometric change in the complexes coordination sphere.

$\begin{array}{lrcl} \mathbf{E} & \qquad [\ce{ML}_n]^{2+} + \ce{e-} &\longrightarrow& [\ce{ML}_n]^+ \\ \mathbf{C} & \qquad [\ce{ML}_n]^+ &\longrightarrow& [\ce{ML}_{n-1}]^+ + \ce{L} \end{array}$

The reaction above would be called an EC reaction.

== Characterization ==
The production of [ML_{n−1}]^{+} in the reaction above by the "following" chemical reaction produces a species directly at the electrode that could display redox chemistry anywhere in a CV plot or none at all. The change in coordination from [ML_{n}]^{+} to [ML_{n−1}]^{+} often prevents the observation of "reversible" behavior during electrochemical experiments like cyclic voltammetry. On the forward scan the expected diffusion wave is observed, in example above the reduction of [ML_{n}]^{2+} to [ML_{n}]^{+}. However, on the return scan the corresponding wave is not observed, in the example above this would be the wave corresponding to the oxidation of [ML_{n}]^{+} to [ML_{n}]^{2+}. In our example there is no [ML_{n}]^{+} to oxidize since it has been converted to [ML_{n−1}]^{+} through ligand loss. The return wave can sometimes be observed by increasing the scan rates so the following chemical reaction can be observed before the chemical reaction takes place. This often requires the use of ultramicroelectrodes (UME) capable of very high scan rates of 0.5 to 5.0 V/s. Plots of forward and reverse peak ratios against modified forms of the scan rate often identify the rate of the chemical reaction. It has become a common practice to model such plots with electrochemical simulations. The results of such studies are of disputed practical relevance since simulation requires excellent experimental data, better than that routinely obtained and reported. Furthermore, the parameters of such studies are rarely reported and often include an unreasonably high variable to data ratio (ref?). A better practice is to look for a simple, well documented relationship between observed results and implied phenomena; or to investigate a specific physical phenomenon using an alternative technique such as chronoamperometry or those involving a rotating electrode.

== Electrocatalysis ==
Electrocatalysis is a catalytic process involving oxidation or reduction through the direct transfer of electrons. The electrochemical mechanisms of electrocatalytic processes are a common research subject for various fields of chemistry and associated sciences. This is important to the development of water oxidation and fuel cells catalysts. For example, half the water oxidation reaction is the reduction of protons to hydrogen, the subsequent half reaction.

$$\ce{2H+ + 2e- -> H2}$$

This reaction requires some form of catalyst to avoid a large overpotential in the delivery of electrons. A catalyst can accomplish this reaction through different reaction pathways, two examples are listed below for the homogeneous catalysts [ML_{n}]^{2+}.

Pathway 1

$\begin{array}{lrcl} \mathbf{E} &\qquad [\ce{ML}_n]^{2+} + \ce{e-} &\longrightarrow& [\ce{ML}_n]^+ \\ \mathbf{C} &\qquad [\ce{ML}_n]^+ + \ce{H+} &\longrightarrow& [\ce{HML}_n]^{2+} \\ \mathbf{E} &\qquad [\ce{HML}_n]^{2+} + \ce{e-} &\longrightarrow& [\ce{HML}_n]^+ \\ \mathbf{C} &\qquad [\ce{HML}_n]^+ + \ce{H+} &\longrightarrow& [\ce{H2ML}_n]^{2+} \\ \mathbf{C} &\qquad [\ce{H2ML}_n]^{2+} &\longrightarrow& [\ce{ML}_n]^{2+} + \ce{H2} \end{array}$

Pathway 2

$\begin{array}{lrcl} \mathbf{E} &\qquad [\ce{ML}_n]^{2+} + \ce{e-} &\longrightarrow& [\ce{ML}_n]^+ \\ \mathbf{C} &\qquad [\ce{ML}_n]^+ + \ce{H+} &\longrightarrow& [\ce{HML}_n]^{2+} \\ \mathbf{C} &\qquad 2\,[\ce{HML}_n]^{2+} &\longrightarrow& 2\,[\ce{ML}_n]^{2+} + \ce{H2} \end{array}$

Pathway 1 is described as an ECECC while pathway 2 would be described as an ECC. If the catalyst was being considered for solid support, pathway 1 which requires a single metal center to function would be a viable candidate. In contrast, a solid support system which separates the individual metal centers would render a catalysts that operates through pathway 2 useless, since it requires a step which is second order in metal center. Determining the reaction mechanism is much like other methods, with some techniques unique to electrochemistry. In most cases electron transfer can be assumed to be much faster than the chemical reactions. Unlike stoichiometric reactions where the steps between the starting materials and the rate limiting step dominate, in catalysis the observed reaction order is usually dominated by the steps between the catalytic resting state and the rate limiting step.

== "Following" physical transformations ==
During potential variant experiments, it is common to go through a redox couple in which the major species is transformed from a species that is soluble in the solution to one that is insoluble. This results in a nucleation process in which a new species plates out on the working electrode. If a species has been deposited on the electrode during a potential sweep then on the return sweep a stripping wave is usually observed.

$\begin{array}{lrcl} \text{Nucleation:} & \quad [\ce{ML}_n]^+_{(aq)} + \ce{e-} &\longrightarrow& [\ce{ML}_n]_{(s)} \\ \text{Stripping:} & \quad [\ce{ML}_n]_{(s)} &\longrightarrow& \ce{e-} + [\ce{ML}_n]^+_{(aq)} \end{array}$

While the nucleation wave may be pronounced or difficult to detect, the stripping wave is usually very distinct. Often these phenomena can be avoided by reducing the concentration of the complex in solution. Neither of these physical state changes involve a chemical reaction mechanism but they are worth mentioning here since the resulting data is at times confused with some chemical reaction mechanisms.
