= Rotating disk electrode =

Working electrode used in hydrodynamic voltammetry

In analytical chemistry, a rotating disk electrode (RDE) is a working electrode used in three-electrode systems for hydrodynamic voltammetry. The electrode rotates during experiments, inducing a flux of analyte to the electrode. These working electrodes are used in electrochemical studies when investigating reaction mechanisms related to redox chemistry, among other chemical phenomena. The more complex rotating ring-disk electrode can be used as a rotating disk electrode if the ring is left inactive during the experiment.

== Structure ==
The electrode includes a conductive disk embedded in an inert non-conductive polymer or resin that can be attached to an electric motor that has very fine control of the electrode's rotation rate. The disk, like any working electrode, is generally made of a noble metal or glassy carbon, however any conductive material can be used based on specific needs.

== Function ==
The disk's rotation is usually described in terms of angular velocity. As the disk turns, some of the solution described as the hydrodynamic boundary layer is dragged by the spinning disk and the resulting centrifugal force flings the solution away from the center of the electrode. Solution flows up, perpendicular to the electrode, from the bulk to replace the boundary layer. The sum result is a laminar flow of solution towards and across the electrode. The rate of the solution flow can be controlled by the electrode's angular velocity and modeled mathematically. This flow can quickly achieve conditions in which the steady-state current is controlled by the solution flow rather than diffusion. This is a contrast to still and unstirred experiments such as cyclic voltammetry where the steady-state current is limited by the diffusion of species in solution.

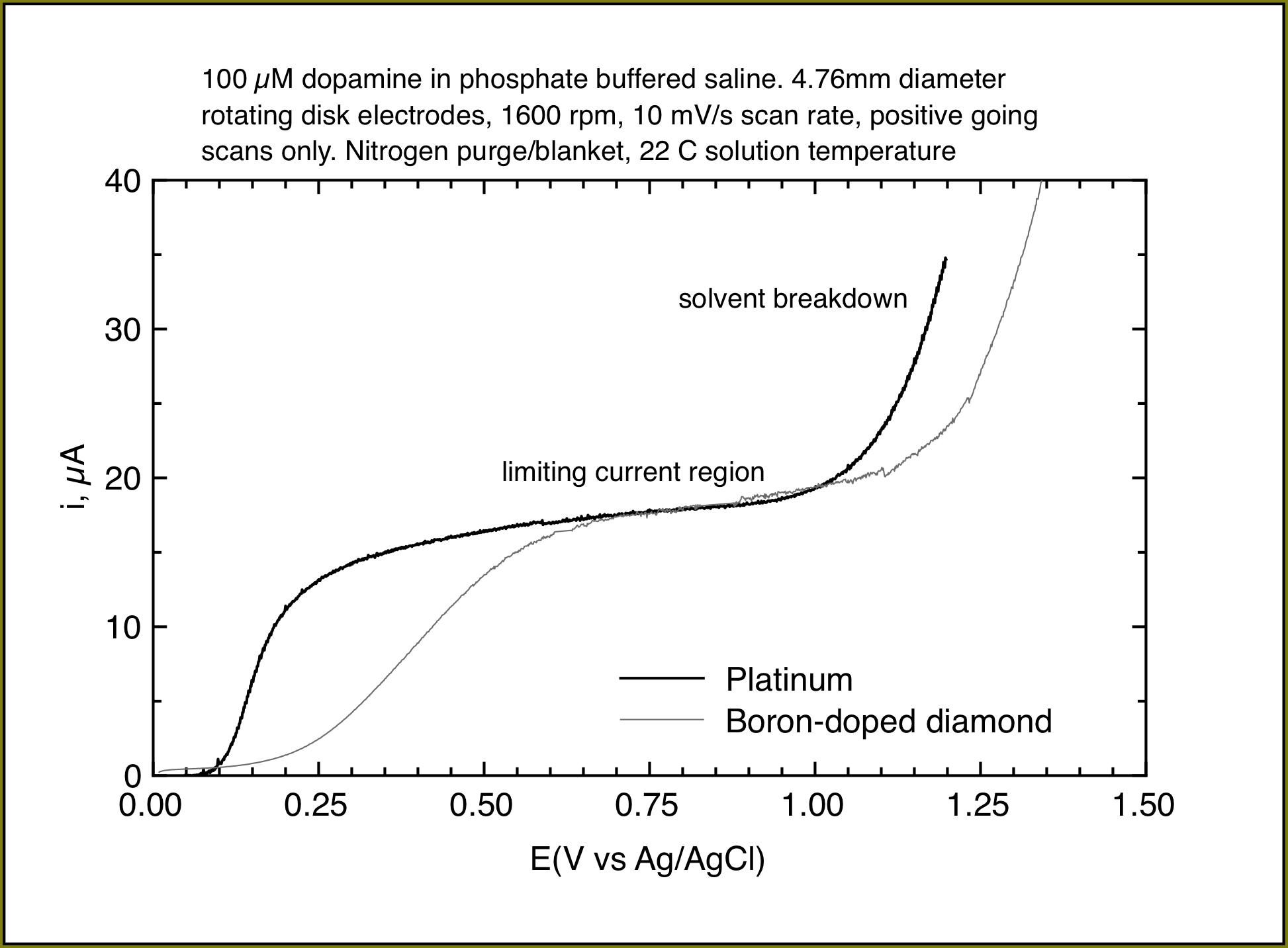
linear sweep voltammogram of 100 μM dopamine in phosphate buffered saline. Adapted from D. Sopchak, PhD thesis, Case Western Reserve University, 2001, figure 4.1

By running linear sweep voltammetry and other experiments at various rotation rates, different electrochemical phenomena can be investigated, including multi-electron transfer, the kinetics of a slow electron transfer, adsorption/desorption steps, and electrochemical reaction mechanisms.

== Differences in behavior from stationary electrodes ==
Potential sweep reversals as used in cyclic voltammetry are different for an RDE system, since the products of the potential sweep are continually swept away from the electrode. A reversal would produce a similar i-E curve, which would closely match the forward scan, except for capacitive charging current. An RDE cannot be used to observe the behavior of the electrode reaction products, since they are continually swept away from the electrode. However, the rotating ring-disk electrode is well suited to investigate this further reactivity. The peak current in a cyclic voltammogram for an RDE is a plateau like region, governed by the Levich equation. The limiting current is typically much higher than the peak current of a stationary electrode, being that the mass transport of reactants is actively stimulated by the rotating disk, and not just governed by diffusion, as is the case for a stationary electrode. Any rotating disk electrode can, of course, also be used as a stationary electrode by using it with the rotator turned off.

== See also ==
- Liquid metal electrode
