= Levich equation =

Model for flow conditions around rotating disk electrodes

The Levich equation models the diffusion and solution flow conditions around a rotating disk electrode (RDE). It is named after Veniamin Grigorievich Levich who first developed an RDE as a tool for electrochemical research. It can be used to predict the current observed at an RDE, in particular, the Levich equation gives the height of the sigmoidal wave observed in rotating disk voltammetry. The sigmoidal wave height is often called the Levich current.

== Equation ==
The Levich equation is written as:

$$I_L = (0.620) n F A D^\frac{2}{3}  \omega^\frac{1}{2}\nu^\frac{-1}{6}C$$

where I_{L} is the Levich current (A), n is the number of moles of electrons transferred in the half reaction (number), F is the Faraday constant (C/mol), A is the electrode area (cm^{2}), D is the diffusion coefficient (see Fick's law of diffusion) (cm^{2}/s), ω is the angular rotation rate of the electrode (rad/s), ν is the kinematic viscosity (cm^{2}/s), C is the analyte concentration (mol/cm^{3}). In this form of the equation, the constant with a value of 0.620 has units of rad^{-1/2}.

The leading term 0.620 is from the calculation of the velocity profile near the surface of the electrode. Using cylindrical coordinates, the von Karman and Cochran solution to the Navier-Stokes equations yields the two relevant profiles to electrochemical study:

$$v_y = -0.51\omega^\frac{3}{2} \nu^\frac{-1}{2} y^2$$
$$v_r = 0.51 \omega^\frac{3}{2} \nu^\frac{-1}{2} ry$$

The Levich equation can subsequently be derived by integrating the steady-state convection diffusion equation:

$$v_y \Big(\frac{\partial C}{\partial y}\Big) = D\frac{\partial^2 C}{\partial y^2}$$

The leading numeric value varies with the units of ω: 0.621 is referred to ω in rad/s; other common values are 1.554 for ω in Hz, and 0.201 for ω in rpm.

Whereas the Levich equation suffices for many purposes, improved forms based on derivations utilising more terms in the velocity expression are available.

== Simplification ==
The Levich equation is often simplified by defining a Levich constant B such that:

$$I_L = \underbrace{(0.620) n F A D^\frac{2}{3} \nu^\frac{-1}{6}C}_{B} \, \omega^\frac{1}{2}=B\, \omega^{0.5}$$
