= Glassy carbon =

Allotrope of carbon

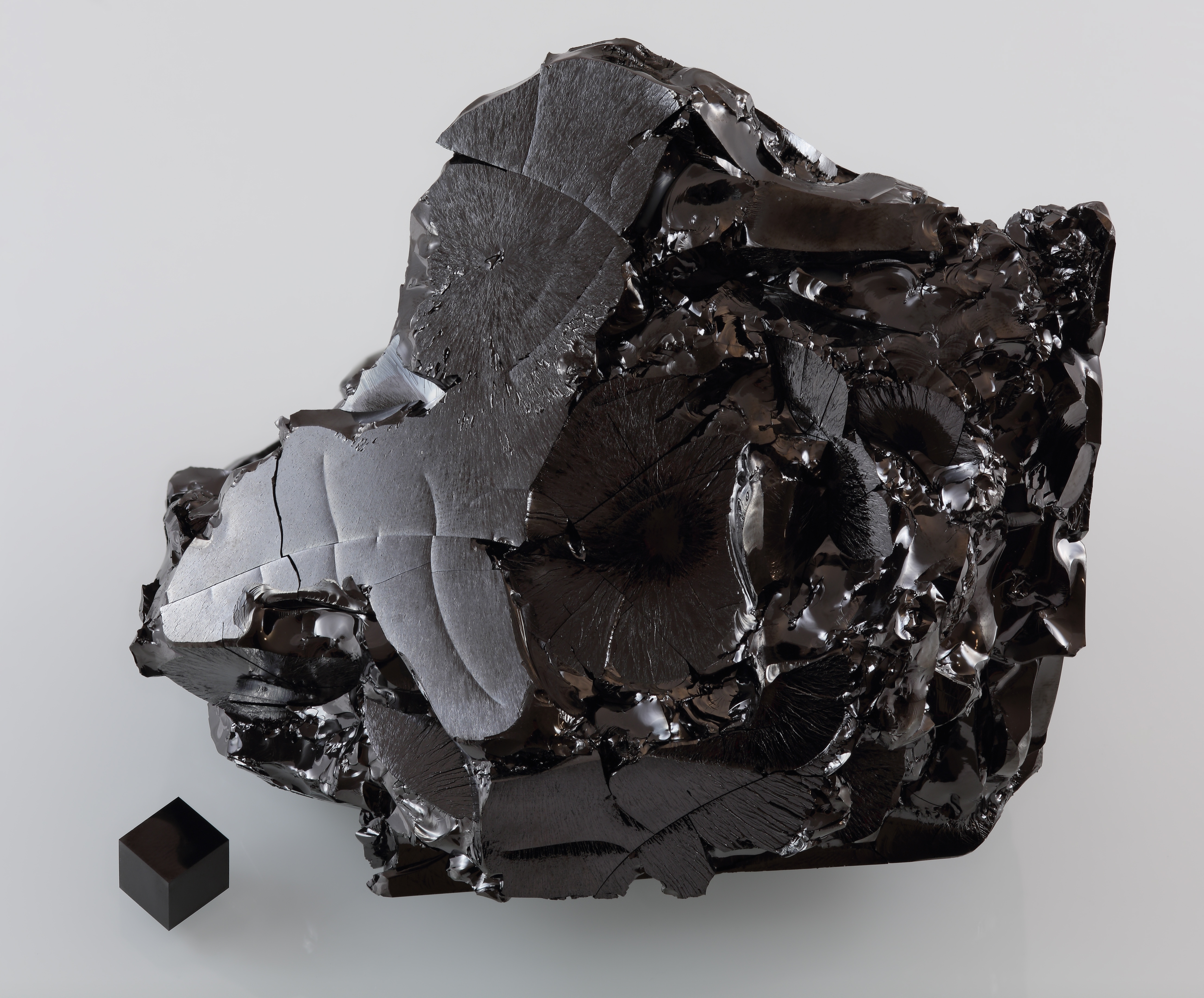
A large sample of glassy carbon, with 1 cm^{3} graphite cube for comparison

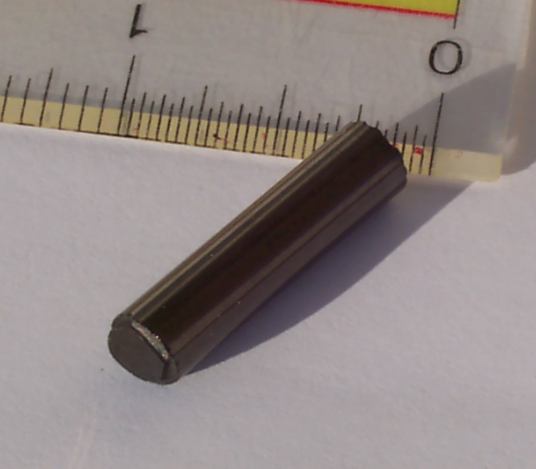
A small rod of glassy carbon

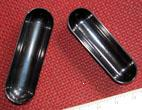
Vitreous-glassy carbon crucibles

Glass-like carbon, often called glassy carbon or vitreous carbon, is a non-graphitizing, or nongraphitizable, carbon which combines glassy and ceramic properties with those of graphite. The most important properties are high thermal stability, high thermal conductivity, hardness (7 Mohs), low density, low electrical resistance, low friction, extreme resistance to chemical attack, and impermeability to gases and liquids. Glassy carbon is widely used as an electrode material in electrochemistry, for high-temperature crucibles, and as a component of some prosthetic devices. It can be fabricated in different shapes, sizes and sections.

The names glassy carbon and vitreous carbon have been registered as trademarks, and IUPAC does not recommend their use as technical terms.

A historical review of glassy carbon was published in 2021.

== History ==
Glassy carbon was first observed in the laboratories of The Carborundum Company, Manchester, UK, in the mid-1950s by Bernard Redfern, a materials scientist and diamond technologist. He noticed that Sellotape he used to hold ceramic (rocket nozzle) samples to the floor of a furnace transformed "into an unusual structure that preserved its original form" after firing in an inert atmosphere. He searched for a polymer matrix to mirror a diamond structure and discovered a resole resin that would, with special preparation, set without a catalyst. Crucibles were produced with this phenolic resin, and distributed to organisations such as UKAEA Harwell.

Redfern left The Carborundum Co., which officially wrote off all interests in the glassy carbon invention. While working at the Plessey Company laboratory in Towcester, UK, Redfern received a glassy carbon crucible for duplication from UKAEA. He identified it as one he had made from markings he had engraved into the uncured precursor prior to carbonisation—it is almost impossible to engrave the finished product. The company set up a laboratory in Litchborough, and then a permanent facility at Caswell, Northamptonshire, which became Plessey Research Caswell and then the Allen Clark Research Centre.

Glassy carbon arrived at the Plessey as a fait accompli. The contribution of Redfern to the invention and production of glassy/vitreous carbon is acknowledged by his co-authorship of early articles, but references to him were not obvious in subsequent publications by Cowlard and Lewis. Original boat crucibles, thick section rods and precursor samples exist.

Redfern's British patent application were filed on 11 January 1960 and he was the author of U.S. patent 3109712A, granted 5 November 1963, priority date 11 January 1960, filing date 9 January 1961. This came after the rescinded British patent. This prior art is not referenced in U.S. patent 4,668,496, 26 May 1987 for Vitreous Carbon. Patents were filed "Bodies and shapes of carbonaceous materials and processes for their production" and the name "Vitreous Carbon" presented to the product by Redfern's son.

Glassy or vitreous carbon was under investigation used for components for thermonuclear detonation systems and at least some of the patents surrounding the material were rescinded (in the interests of national security) in the 1960s.

Large sections of the precursor material were produced as castings, mouldings or machined into a predetermined shape. Large crucibles and other forms were manufactured.

Carbonisation took place in two stages. Shrinkage during this process is considerable (48.8%) but is absolutely uniform and predictable. A nut and bolt can be made to fit while in polymer form, processed separately but identically, and subsequently give a perfect fit.

Some of the first ultra-pure samples of gallium arsenide (GaAs) were zone refined in these crucibles, as glassy carbon is not reactive with GaAs.

Doped or impure glassy carbon exhibits semiconductor phenomena.

Vitreous carbon was fabricated with uranium carbide inclusions, on an experimental scale, using uranium-238.

On 11 October 2011, research conducted at the Carnegie Geophysical Laboratory led by Wendy L. Mao from Stanford, and her graduate student Yu Lin, described a new form of glassy carbon formed under high pressure, with hardness equal to diamond – a kind of diamond-like carbon. Unlike diamond, however its structure is that of amorphous carbon so its hardness may be isotropic. Research was ongoing as of 2011.

== Reticulated vitreous carbon ==
Vitreous carbon can also be produced as a foam, called reticulated vitreous carbon (RVC). This foam was first developed in the mid to late 1960s as a thermally insulating, microporous glassy carbon electrode material. RVC foam is a strong, inert, electrically and thermally conductive, and corrosion-resistant porous form of carbon with a low resistance to gas and fluid flow. Due to these characteristics, the most widespread use of RVC in scientific work is as a three-dimensional electrode in electrochemistry. Additionally, RVC foams are characterized by an exceptionally high void volume, high surface area, and very high thermal resistance in non-oxidising environments, which allows for heat sterilization and facilitates manipulation in biological applications.

== Structure ==
The structure of glassy carbon has long been a subject of debate.

Early structural models assumed that both sp^{2}- and sp^{3}-bonded atoms were present, but it is now known that glassy carbon is entirely sp^{2}. More recent research has suggested that glassy carbon has a fullerene-related structure.

It exhibits a conchoidal fracture.

Note that glassy carbon should not be confused with amorphous carbon. This from IUPAC:

"Glass-like carbon cannot be described as amorphous carbon because it consists of two-dimensional structural elements and does not exhibit 'dangling' bonds."

== Electrochemical properties ==
Glassy carbon electrode (GCE) in aqueous solutions is considered to be an inert electrode for hydronium ion reduction:

$\ce{\overset{hydronium}{H3O+_{(aq)}} + e^- <=>[\ce{GCE}] H._{(aq)}}$ $E^\ominus = -2.10\ \mathrm{V}$ versus NHE at 25 °C

Comparable reaction on platinum:

$\ce{H3O+_{(aq)}{} + Pt_{(s)} + e^- <=> Pt:H_{(s)}}$ $E^\ominus = \ 0.000\ \mathrm{V}$ versus NHE at 25 °C

The difference of 2.1 V is attributed to the properties of platinum which stabilizes a covalent Pt-H bond.

== Physical properties ==
Properties include 'high temperature resistance', hardness (7 Mohs), low density, low electrical resistance, low friction, and low thermal resistance.

== Applications ==
Due to its specific surface orientation, glassy carbon is employed as an electrode material for the fabrication of sensors. Carbon paste, glassy carbon paste, glassy carbon, etc. electrodes when modified are termed chemically modified electrodes. Vitreous carbon and carbon/carbon fibre composites are used for dental implants and heart valves because of their bio-compatibility, stability and simple manufacturing techniques.

== See also ==
- Electrochemistry
- Fullerene
- Graphite
- Jet (lignite)
- Polycrystalline silicon
- Shungite
