= Electroanalytical methods =

Analytical methods in chemistry

Electroanalytical methods are a class of techniques in analytical chemistry which study an analyte by measuring the potential (volts) and/or current (amperes) in an electrochemical cell containing the analyte. These methods can be broken down into several categories depending on which aspects of the cell are controlled and which are measured. The three main categories are potentiometry (the difference in electrode potentials is measured), amperometry (electric current is the analytical signal), coulometry (charge passed during a certain time is recorded).

== Potentiometry ==
Potentiometry passively measures the potential of a solution between two electrodes, affecting the solution very little in the process. One electrode is called the reference electrode and has a constant potential, while the other one is an indicator electrode whose potential changes with the sample's composition. Therefore, the difference in potential between the two electrodes gives an assessment of the sample's composition. In fact, since the potentiometric measurement is a non-destructive measurement, assuming that the electrode is in equilibrium with the solution, we are measuring the solution's potential. Potentiometry usually uses indicator electrodes made selectively sensitive to the ion of interest, such as fluoride in fluoride selective electrodes, so that the potential solely depends on the activity of this ion of interest. The time that takes the electrode to establish equilibrium with the solution will affect the sensitivity or accuracy of the measurement. In aquatic environments, platinum is often used due to its high electron transfer kinetics, although an electrode made from several metals can be used in order to enhance the electron transfer kinetics. The most common potentiometric electrode is by far the glass-membrane electrode used in a pH meter.

A variant of potentiometry is chronopotentiometry which consists in using a constant current and measurement of potential as a function of time. It has been initiated by Weber.

== Amperometry ==
Amperometry indicates the whole of electrochemical techniques in which a current is measured as a function of an independent variable that is, typically, time (in a chronoamperometry) or electrode potential (in a voltammetry). Chronoamperometry is the technique in which the current is measured, at a fixed potential, at different times since the start of polarisation. Chronoamperometry is typically carried out in unstirred solution and at the fixed electrode, i.e., under experimental conditions avoiding convection as the mass transfer to the electrode. On the other hand, voltammetry is a subclass of amperometry, in which the current is measured by varying the potential applied to the electrode. According to the waveform that describes the way how the potential is varied as a function of time, the different voltammetric techniques are defined.

=== Chronoamperometry ===
In a chronoamperometry, a sudden step in potential is applied at the working electrode and the current is measured as a function of time. Since this is not an exhaustive method, microelectrodes are used and the amount of time used to perform the experiments is usually very short, typically 20 ms to 1 s, as to not consume the analyte.

=== Voltammetry ===
A voltammetry consists in applying a constant and/or varying potential at an electrode's surface and measuring the resulting current with a three-electrode system. This method can reveal the reduction potential of an analyte and its electrochemical reactivity. This method, in practical terms, is non-destructive since only a very small amount of the analyte is consumed at the two-dimensional surface of the working and auxiliary electrodes. In practice, the analyte solution is usually disposed of since it is difficult to separate the analyte from the bulk electrolyte, and the experiment requires a small amount of analyte. A normal experiment may involve 1–10 mL solution with an analyte concentration between 1 and 10 mmol/L. More advanced voltammetric techniques can work with microliter volumes and down to nanomolar concentrations. Chemically modified electrodes are employed for the analysis of organic and inorganic samples.

==== Polarography ====
Polarography is a subclass of voltammetry that uses a dropping mercury electrode as the working electrode.

== Coulometry ==
Coulometry uses applied current or potential to convert an analyte from one oxidation state to another completely. In these experiments, the total current passed is measured directly or indirectly to determine the number of electrons passed. Knowing the number of electrons passed can indicate the concentration of the analyte or when the concentration is known, the number of electrons transferred in the redox reaction. Typical forms of coulometry include bulk electrolysis, also known as Potentiostatic coulometry or controlled potential coulometry, as well as a variety of coulometric titrations.

== Bibliography ==
- Wang, Joseph C. (2000). Analytical electrochemistry. Chichester: John Wiley & Sons. ISBN 978-0-471-28272-3.
- Hubert H. Girault (2004). Analytical and physical electrochemistry. [Lausanne: EPFL. ISBN 978-0-8247-5357-3.
- Ozomwna, Kenneth I., ed. (2007). Recent Advances in Analytical Electrochemistry 2007. Transworld Research Network. ISBN 978-81-7895-274-1.
- Dahmen, E. A. M. F. (1986). Electroanalysis: theory and applications in aqueous and non-aqueous media and in automated chemical control. Amsterdam: Elsevier. ISBN 978-0-444-42534-8.
- Bond, A. Curtis (1980). Modern polarographic methods in analytical chemistry. New York: M. Dekker. ISBN 978-0-8247-6849-2.
