= Working electrode =

Electrode on which an electrochemical reaction occurs

In electrochemistry, the working electrode is the electrode in an electrochemical system on which the reaction of interest is occurring. The working electrode is often used in conjunction with an auxiliary electrode, and a reference electrode in a three-electrode system. Depending on whether the reaction on the electrode is a reduction or an oxidation, the working electrode is called cathodic or anodic, respectively. Common working electrodes can consist of materials ranging from noble metals such as gold or platinum, to inert carbon such as glassy carbon, boron-doped diamond or pyrolytic carbon, and mercury drop and film electrodes. Chemically modified electrodes are employed for the analysis of both organic and inorganic samples.

== Special types ==
- Ultramicroelectrode (UME)
- Rotating disk electrode (RDE)
- Rotating ring-disk electrode (RRDE)
- Hanging mercury drop electrode (HMDE)
- Dropping mercury electrode (DME)

== See also ==
- Auxiliary electrode
- Electrochemical cell
- Electrochemistry
- Electrode potential
- Electrosynthesis
- Reference electrode
- Voltammetry
