= Differential pulse voltammetry =

Method of chemical analysis

Differential pulse voltammetry (DPV) (also differential pulse polarography, DPP) is a voltammetry method used to make electrochemical measurements and a derivative of linear sweep voltammetry or staircase voltammetry, with a series of regular voltage pulses superimposed on the potential linear sweep or stairsteps. The current is measured immediately before each potential change, and the current difference is plotted as a function of potential. By sampling the current just before the potential is changed, the effect of the charging current can be decreased.

By contrast, in normal pulse voltammetry the current resulting from a series of ever larger potential pulses is compared with the current at a constant 'baseline' voltage. Another type of pulse voltammetry is squarewave voltammetry, which can be considered a special type of differential pulse voltammetry in which equal time is spent at the potential of the ramped baseline and potential of the superimposed pulse.

== Electrochemical cell ==
The system of this measurement is usually the same as that of standard voltammetry. The potential between the working electrode and the reference electrode is changed as a pulse from an initial potential to an interlevel potential and remains at the interlevel potential for about 5 to 100 milliseconds; then it changes to the final potential, which is different from the initial potential. The pulse is repeated, changing the final potential, and a constant difference is kept between the initial and the interlevel potential. The value of the current between the working electrode and auxiliary electrode before and after the pulse are sampled and their differences are plotted versus potential.

== Uses ==
These measurements can be used to study the redox properties of extremely low concentrations of chemicals because of the following two features: 1) in these measurements, the effect of the charging current can be minimized, so high sensitivity is achieved and 2) only faradaic current is extracted, so electrode reactions can be analyzed more precisely.

== Characteristics ==
Differential pulse voltammetry has these characteristics: 1) reversible reactions have symmetric peaks, and irreversible reactions have asymmetric peaks, 2) the peak potential is equal to E_{1/2}^{r}-ΔE in reversible reactions, and the peak current is proportional to the concentration, 3) The detection limit is about 10^{−8} M.

== See also ==
- Voltammetry
- Electroanalytical method
