= Electrochemical stripping analysis =

Method of chemical analysis

A: cleaning step, B: electroplating step, C: equilibration step, D: stripping step

Electrochemical stripping analysis is a set of analytical chemistry methods based on voltammetry or potentiometry that are used for quantitative determination of ions in solution. Stripping voltammetry (anodic, cathodic and adsorptive) have been employed for analysis of organic molecules as well as metal ions. Carbon paste, glassy carbon paste, and glassy carbon electrodes when modified are termed as chemically modified electrodes and have been employed for the analysis of organic and inorganic compounds.

Stripping analysis is an analytical technique that involves (i) preconcentration of a metal phase onto a solid electrode surface or into Hg (liquid) at negative potentials and (ii) selective oxidation of each metal phase species during an anodic potential sweep. Stripping analysis has the following properties: sensitive and reproducible (RSD<5%) method for trace metal ion analysis in aqueous media, 2) concentration limits of detection for many metals are in the low ppb to high ppt range (S/N=3) and this compares favorably with AAS or ICP analysis, field deployable instrumentation that is inexpensive, approximately 12-15 metal ions can be analyzed by this method. The stripping peak currents and peak widths are a function of the size, coverage and distribution of the metal phase on the electrode surface (Hg or alternate).

== Anodic stripping voltammetry ==
Anodic stripping voltammetry is a voltammetric method for quantitative determination of specific ionic species. The analyte of interest is electroplated on the working electrode during a deposition step, and oxidized from the electrode during the stripping step. The current is measured during the stripping step. The oxidation of species is registered as a peak in the current signal at the potential at which the species begins to be oxidized. The stripping step can be either linear, staircase, squarewave, or pulse.

Anodic stripping voltammetry usually incorporates three electrodes, a working electrode, auxiliary electrode (sometimes called the counter electrode), and reference electrode. The solution being analyzed usually has an electrolyte added to it. For most standard tests, the working electrode is a bismuth or mercury film electrode (in a disk or planar strip configuration). The mercury film forms an amalgam with the analyte of interest, which upon oxidation results in a sharp peak, improving resolution between analytes. The mercury film is formed over a glassy carbon electrode. A mercury drop electrode has also been used for much the same reasons. In cases where the analyte of interest has an oxidizing potential above that of mercury, or where a mercury electrode would be otherwise unsuitable, a solid, inert metal such as silver, gold, or platinum may also be used.

Anodic stripping voltammetry usually incorporates 4 steps if the working electrode is a mercury film or mercury drop electrode and the solution incorporates stirring. The solution is stirred during the first two steps at a repeatable rate. The first step is a cleaning step; in the cleaning step, the potential is held at a more oxidizing potential than the analyte of interest for a period of time in order to fully remove it from the electrode. In the second step, the potential is held at a lower potential, low enough to reduce the analyte and deposit it on the electrode. After the second step, the stirring is stopped, and the electrode is kept at the lower potential. The purpose of this third step is to allow the deposited material to distribute more evenly in the mercury. If a solid inert electrode is used, this step is unnecessary. The last step involves raising the working electrode to a higher potential (anodic), and stripping (oxidizing) the analyte. As the analyte is oxidized, it gives off electrons which are measured as a current.

Anodic stripping voltammetry can detect μg/L concentrations of analyte. This method has an excellent detection limit (typically 10^{−9} - 10^{−10} M).

== Cathodic stripping voltammetry ==
Cathodic stripping voltammetry is a voltammetric method for quantitative determination of specific ionic species. It is similar to the trace analysis method anodic stripping voltammetry, except that for the plating step, the potential is held at an oxidizing potential, and the oxidized species are stripped from the electrode by sweeping the potential negatively. This technique is used for ionic species that form insoluble salts and will deposit on or near the anodic, working electrode during deposition. The stripping step can be either linear, staircase, squarewave, or pulse.

== Adsorptive stripping voltammetry ==
Adsorptive stripping voltammetry is similar to anodic and cathodic stripping voltammetry except that the preconcentration step is not controlled by electrolysis. The preconcentration step in adsorptive stripping voltammetry is accomplished by adsorption on the working electrode surface, or by reactions with chemically modified electrodes.
