= Voltameter =

Instrument for measuring electric charge

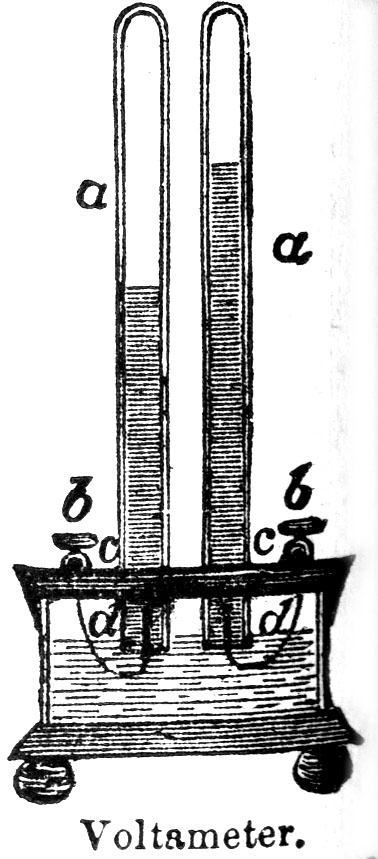
A 19th century version of a voltameter.

A voltameter or coulometer is a scientific instrument used for measuring electric charge (quantity of electricity) through electrolytic action. The SI unit of electric charge is the coulomb.

The voltameter should not be confused with a voltmeter, which measures electric potential. The SI unit for electric potential is the volt.

== Etymology ==
Michael Faraday used an apparatus that he termed a "volta-electrometer"; subsequently John Frederic Daniell called this a "voltameter".

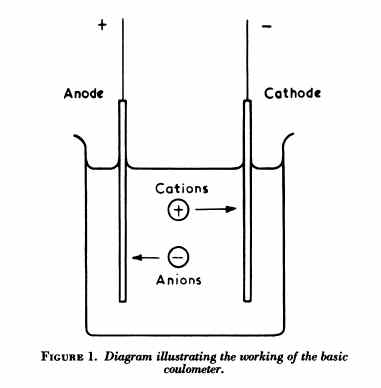
Coulometer

== Types ==
The voltameter is an electrolytic cell and the measurement is made by weighing the element deposited or released at the cathode in a specified time.

=== Silver voltameter ===
This is the most accurate type. It consists of two silver plates in a solution of silver nitrate. When current is flowing, silver dissolves at the anode and is deposited at the cathode. The cathode is initially massed, current is passed for a measured time and the cathode is massed again.

=== Copper coulometer ===
This is similar to the silver voltameter but the anode and cathode are copper and the solution is copper sulfate, acidified with sulfuric acid. It is cheaper than the silver voltameter, but slightly less accurate.

=== Mercury voltameter ===
In this device, mercury is used to determine the amount of charges transformed during the following reaction:

$$\ce{{Hg2+} + 2e- <=> Hg^\circ}$$

These oxidation/reduction processes have 100% efficiency with the wide range of the current densities. Measuring of the quantity of electricity (coulombs) is based on the changes of the mass of the mercury electrode. Mass of the electrode can be increased during cathodic deposition of the mercury ions or decreased during the anodic dissolution of the metal.

=== Sulfuric acid voltameter ===
The anode and cathode are platinum and the solution is dilute sulfuric acid. Hydrogen is released at the cathode and collected in a graduated tube so that its volume can be measured. The volume is adjusted to standard temperature and pressure and the mass of hydrogen is calculated from the volume. This kind of voltameter is sometimes called Hofmann voltameter.

== Coulometer ==
A coulometer is a device to determine electric charges. The term comes from the unit of charge, the coulomb. There can be two goals in measuring charge:

Coulometers can be devices that are used to determine an amount of substance by measuring the charges. The devices do a quantitative analysis. This method is called coulometry, and related coulometers are either devices used for a coulometry or instruments that perform a coulometry in an automatic way.

Coulometers can be used to determine electric quantities in the direct current circuit, namely the total charge or a constant current. These devices invented by Michael Faraday were used frequently in the 19th century and in the first half of the 20th century. In the past, the coulometers of that type were named voltameters or coulomb meters.

== See also ==
- Electrochemical cell
- Electrochemical equivalent
- Electrochemistry
- Electrolysis
- Electrolytic cell
- Equivalent (chemistry)
- Equivalent weight
- Faraday's laws of electrolysis
- Stoichiometry

== Sources ==
- Practical Electricity by W. E. Ayrton and T. Mather, published by Cassell and Company, London, 1911, pp 12–26
