= Bulk electrolysis =

Method of chemical analysis

Bulk electrolysis is also known as potentiostatic coulometry or controlled potential coulometry. The experiment is a form of coulometry which generally employs a three electrode system controlled by a potentiostat. In the experiment the working electrode is held at a constant potential (volts) and current (amps) is monitored over time (seconds). In a properly run experiment an analyte is quantitatively converted from its original oxidation state to a new oxidation state, either reduced or oxidized. As the substrate is consumed, the current also decreases, approaching zero when the conversion nears completion.

The results of a bulk electrolysis are visually displayed as the total coulombs passed (total electric charge) plotted against time in seconds, even though the experiment measures electric current (amps) over time. This is done to show that the experiment is approaching an expected total number of coulombs.

== Fundamental relationships and applications ==
The sample mass, molecular mass, number of electrons in the electrode reaction, and number of electrons passed during the experiment are all related by Faraday's laws of electrolysis. It follows that, if three of the values are known, then the fourth can be calculated. The bulk electrolysis can also be useful for synthetic purposes if the product of the electrolysis can be isolated. This is most convenient when the product is neutral and can be isolated from the electrolyte solution through extraction or when the product plates out on the electrode or precipitates in another fashion. Even if the product can not be isolated, other analytical techniques can be performed on the solution including NMR, EPR, UV-Vis, FTIR, among other techniques depending on the specific situation. In specially designed cells the solution can be actively monitored during the experiment.

== Cell design ==
In most three electrode experiments there are two isolated cells. One contains the auxiliary and working electrode, while the other contains the reference electrode. Strictly speaking, the reference electrode does not require a separate compartment. A Quasi-Reference Electrode such as a silver/silver chloride wire electrode can be exposed directly to the analyte solution. In such situations there is concern that the analyte and trace redox products may interact with the reference electrode and either render it useless or increase drift. As a result, even these simple references are commonly sequestered in their own cells. The more complex references such as standard hydrogen electrode, saturated calomel electrode, or silver chloride electrode(specific concentration) can not directly mix the analyte solution for fear the electrode will fall apart or interact/react with the analyte.

A bulk electrolysis is best performed in a three part cell in which both the auxiliary electrode and reference electrode have their own cell which connects to the cell containing the working electrode. This isolates the undesired redox events taking place at the auxiliary electrode. During bulk electrolysis, the analyte undergoes a redox event at the working electrode. If the system was open, then it would be possible for the product of that reaction to diffuse back to the auxiliary electrode and undergo the inverse redox reaction. In addition to maintaining the proper current at the working electrode, the auxiliary electrode will experience extreme potentials often oxidizing or reducing the solvent or electrolyte to balance the current. In voltammetry experiments, the currents (amps) are so small and it is not a problem to decompose a small amount of solvent or electrolyte. In contrast, a bulk electrolysis involves currents greater by several orders of magnitude. At the auxiliary electrode, this greater current would decompose a significant amount of the solution/electrolyte and probably boiling the solution in the process all in an effort to balance the current. To mitigate this challenge the auxiliary cell will often contain a stoichiometric or greater amount of sacrificial reductant (ferrocene) or sacrificial oxidant (ferrocenium) to balance the overall redox reaction.

For ideal performance the auxiliary electrode should be similar in surface area, as close as possible, and evenly spaced with the working electrode. This is in an effort to prevent "hot spots". Hot spots are the result of current following the path of least resistance. This means much of the redox chemistry will occur at the points at either end of the shortest path between the working and auxiliary electrode. Heating associated with the capacitances resistance of the solution can occur at the area around these points, actually boiling the solution. The bubbling resulting from this isolated boiling of the solution can be confused with gas evolution.

== Rates and kinetics ==
The rate of such reactions/experiments is not determined by the concentration of the solution, but rather the mass transfer of the substrate in the solution to the electrode surface. Rates will increase when the volume of the solution is decreased, the solution is stirred more rapidly, or the area of the working electrode is increased. Since mass transfer is so important the solution is stirred during a bulk electrolysis. However, this technique is generally not considered a hydrodynamic technique, since a laminar flow of solution against the electrode is neither the objective or outcome of the stirring.

Bulk electrolysis is occasionally cited in the literature as means to study electrochemical reaction rates. However, bulk electrolysis is generally a poor method to study electrochemical reaction rates since the rate of bulk electrolysis is generally governed by the specific cells ability to perform mass transfer. Rates slower than this mass transfer bottleneck are rarely of interest.

== Efficiency and thermodynamics ==
Electrocatalytic analyzes will often mention the current efficiency or faradaic efficiency of a given process determined by a bulk electrolysis experiment. For example, if one molecule of hydrogen results from every two electrons inserted into an acidic solution then the faradaic efficiency would be 100%. This indicates that the electrons did not end up performing some other reaction. For example, the oxidation of water will often produce oxygen as well as hydrogen peroxide at the anode. Each of these products is related to its own faradaic efficiency which is tied to the experimental arrangement.

Nor is current efficiency the same as thermodynamic efficiency, since it never address the how much energy (potential in volts) is in the electrons added or removed. The voltage efficiency determined by the reactions overpotential is more directly related to the thermodynamics of the electrochemical reaction. In fact the extent to which a reaction goes to completion is related to how much greater the applied potential is than the reduction potential of interest. In the case where multiple reduction potentials are of interest, it is often difficult to set an electrolysis potential a "safe" distance (such as 200 mV) past a redox event. The result is incomplete conversion of the substrate, or else conversion of some of the substrate to the more reduced form. This factor must be considered when analyzing the current passed and when attempting to do further analysis/isolation/experiments with the substrate solution.
