= Coulometry =

Method of chemical analysis

In analytical electrochemistry, coulometry is the measure of charge (coulombs) transfer during an electrochemical redox reaction. It can be used for precision measurements of charge, but coulometry is mainly used for analytical applications to determine the amount of matter transformed.

There are two main categories of coulometric techniques. Amperostatic coulometry, or coulometric titration keeps the current constant using an amperostat. Potentiostatic coulometry holds the electric potential constant during the reaction using a potentiostat.

== History ==
The term coulometry was introduced in 1938 by Hungarian chemist László Szebellédy and Zoltán Somogyi. Coulometry is the measure of charge, thus named after its unit the coulomb.

Michael Faraday, known for his work in electricity and magnetism, made critical contributions to the field of electrochemistry. He discovered the laws of electrolysis, and in his recognition is the eponym of the Faraday constant. In the earliest developments of coulometry, Faraday proposed the first instrument to measure charge by utilizing the electrolysis of water.

Surface coulometry, the method of determining metallic layers or oxide films on metals, was first applied by American Chemist G. G. Grower in 1917 by checking the quality of tinned copper wire.

Coulometric methods were used widely in the middle of the twentieth century but voltammetric methods and non-electrochemical analytical methods took over decreasing the use for coulometry, but one method widely used today is the Karl Fischer method.

== Potentiostatic coulometry ==
Potentiostatic coulometry utilizes a constant electric potential and is a technique most commonly referred to as "bulk electrolysis". Also called direct coulometry, the analyte is oxidized or reduced at the working electrode without intermediate reactions. The working electrode is kept at a constant potential and the current that flows through the circuit is measured. This constant potential is applied long enough to fully reduce or oxidize all of the electroactive species in a given solution. As the electroactive molecules are consumed, the current also decreases, approaching zero when the conversion is complete. The sample mass, molecular mass, number of electrons in the electrode reaction, and number of electrons passed during the experiment are all related by Faraday's laws. It follows that, if three of the values are known, then the fourth can be calculated.

Bulk electrolysis is often used to unambiguously assign the number of electrons consumed in a reaction observed through voltammetry. It also has the added benefit of producing a solution of a species (oxidation state) which may not be accessible through chemical routes. This species can then be isolated or further characterized while in solution.

The rate of such reactions is not determined by the concentration of the solution, but rather the mass transfer of the electroactive species in the solution to the electrode surface. Rates will increase when the volume of the solution is decreased, the solution is stirred more rapidly, or the area of the working electrode is increased. Since mass transfer is so important the solution is stirred during a bulk electrolysis. However, this technique is generally not considered a hydrodynamic technique, since a laminar flow of solution against the electrode is neither the objective nor outcome of the stirring.

The extent to which a reaction goes to completion is also related to how much greater the applied potential is than the reduction potential of interest. In the case where multiple reduction potentials are of interest, it is often difficult to set an electrolysis potential a "safe" distance (such as 200 mV) past a redox event. The result is incomplete conversion of the substrate, or else conversion of some of the substrate to the more reduced form. This factor must be considered when analyzing the current passed and when attempting to do further analysis/isolation/experiments with the substrate solution.

An advantage to this kind of analysis over electrogravimetry is that it does not require that the product of the reaction be weighed. This is useful for reactions where the product does not deposit as a solid, such as the determination of the amount of arsenic in a sample from the electrolysis of arsenous acid (H_{3}AsO_{3}) to arsenic acid (H_{3}AsO_{4}).

== Coulometric titration ==
Coulometric titrations under a constant current system quantifies the analyte by measuring the duration that current passes through the sample. In indirect or secondary coulometry, the working electrode produces a titrant that reacts with the analyte. When the analyte is completely consumed, endpoint detection is employed, preferably with an instrumental method for higher precision. The total charge that has flowed through the sample can be determined from the magnitude of the current (in amperes) and the duration of the current (in seconds). Using Faraday's Law, total charge can be used to determine the moles of the unknown species in solution. When the volume of the solution is known, the molarity of the unknown species can be determined.

Advantages of coulometric titration

Coulometric titration has the advantage that constant current sources for the generation of titrants are relatively easy to make.

- The electrochemical generation of a titrant is much more sensitive and can be much more accurately controlled than the mechanical addition of titrant using a burette drive. For example, a constant current flow of 10 μA for 100 ms is easily generated and corresponds to about 10 micrograms of titrant.
- The preparation of standard solutions and titer determination is no longer necessary.
- Chemical substances that are unstable or difficult to handle because of their high volatility or reactivity in solution can also very easily be used as titrants. Examples are bromine, chlorine, Ti^{3+}, Sn^{2+}, Cr^{2+}, and Karl Fischer reagents (iodine).
- Coulometric titration can also be performed under inert atmosphere or be remotely controlled e.g. with radioactive substances.
- Complete automation is simpler.

== Applications ==
=== Karl Fischer reaction to determine water content ===
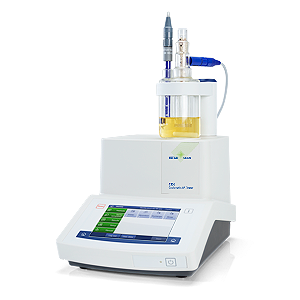
Karl Fischer Coulometer Auto Titrator

The Karl Fischer reaction uses a coulometric titration to determine the amount of water in a sample. It can determine concentrations of water on the order of milligrams per liter. It is used to find the amount of water in substances such as butter, sugar, cheese, paper, and petroleum.

The reaction involves converting solid iodine into hydrogen iodide in the presence of sulfur dioxide and water. Methanol is most often used as the solvent, but ethylene glycol and diethylene glycol also work. Pyridine is often used to prevent the buildup of sulfuric acid, although the use of imidazole and diethanolamine for this role are becoming more common. All reagents must be anhydrous for the analysis to be quantitative. The balanced chemical equation, using methanol and pyridine, is:

$$\ce{[C5H5NH]SO3CH3 + I2 + H2O + 2 C5H5N -> [C5H5NH]SO4CH3 + 2 [C5H5NH]I}$$

In this reaction, a single molecule of water reacts with a molecule of iodine. Since this technique is used to determine the water content of samples, atmospheric humidity could alter the results. Therefore, the system is usually isolated with drying tubes or placed in an inert gas container. In addition, the solvent will undoubtedly have some water in it so the solvent's water content must be measured to compensate for this inaccuracy.

To determine the amount of water in the sample, analysis must first be performed using either back or direct titration. In the direct method, just enough of the reagents will be added to completely use up all of the water. At this point in the titration, the current approaches zero. It is then possible to relate the amount of reagents used to the amount of water in the system via stoichiometry. The back-titration method is similar, but involves the addition of an excess of the reagent. This excess is then consumed by adding a known amount of a standard solution with known water content. The result reflects the water content of the sample and the standard solution. Since the amount of water in the standard solution is known, the difference reflects the water content of the sample.

=== Determination of film thickness ===
Coulometry can be used in the determination of the thickness of metallic coatings. This method is called surface coulometry and is performed by measuring the quantity of electricity needed to dissolve a well-defined area of the coating. The film thickness $\Delta$ is proportional to the constant current $i$, the molecular weight $M$ of the metal, the density $\rho$ of the metal, and the surface area $A$:

$\triangle \propto \frac{iM}{A\rho}$

The electrodes for this reaction are often platinum electrode and an electrode that relates to the reaction. For tin coating on a copper wire, a tin electrode is used, while a sodium chloride-zinc sulfate electrode would be used to determine the zinc film on a piece of steel. Special cells have been created to adhere to the surface of the metal to measure its thickness. These are basically columns with the internal electrodes with magnets or weights to attach to the surface. The results obtained by this coulometric method are similar to those achieved by other chemical and metallurgic techniques.

=== Coulometry in Healthcare ===
==== Determination of Chloride Levels ====
A type of clinical chemistry is measuring chloride levels in blood samples through a Cotlove chloridometer. Kidneys are responsible for the reabsorption of chloride to maintain electrolyte homeostasis. Measuring chloride levels allows for electrolyte stability, without this feature diseases such as hyperchoremia and hypochloremia would be harder to detect leaving body functions compromised.

==== Determination of Antioxidant Capacity in Human Blood ====
Coulometry can be used to measure the total antioxidant capacity (TAC) in blood and plasma through electrogenerated bromide. A method was developed that used TAC blood sampled from patients with chronic renal disease going through hemodialysis to research changes in TAC levels that could then be applied in clinics.

== Coulometers ==
=== Electronic coulometer ===
The electronic coulometer is based on the application of the operational amplifier in the "integrator"-type circuit. The current passed through the resistor R1 makes a potential drop which is integrated by operational amplifier on the capacitor plates; the higher current, the larger the potential drop. The current need not be constant. In such scheme V_{out} is proportional of the passed charge. Sensitivity of the coulometer can be changed by choosing of the appropriate value of R_{1}.

=== Electrochemical coulometers ===
There are three common types of coulometers based on electrochemical processes:

- Copper coulometer
- Mercury coulometer
- Hofmann voltameter

"Voltameter" is a synonym for "coulometer".

=== Coulometric Microtitrators ===
An acid-base microtitorator utilizes the electrolysis of water, where protons or hydroxide ions are produced at the working electrode. The analyte reacts with the generated reagent, buffering the overall rate of reagent generation. A pH gradient forms from the diffusion of these reagents, where a pH sensor will determine the endpoint.

Some advantages of using a microtitrator include the fast completion time of the titration due to the micro-scale. Additionally, a negligibly small amount of the sample is consumed, so titrations can be repeatedly analyzed with the same sample. On the contrary, microtitrators require calibration because diffusion is variable, and thus this method is not absolute.

== Bibliography ==
- A. de Agostini (2002). Coulometric Titration. Switzerland: Mettler-Toledo GmbH. p. 3.
