= Chloridometer =

Measuring Instrument

A chloridometer is a measuring instrument used to determine the concentration of chloride ions (Cl^{–}) in a solution. It uses a process known as coulometric titration or amperostatic coulometry, the accepted electrochemistry reference method to determine the concentration of chloride in biological fluids, including blood serum, blood plasma, urine, sweat, and cerebrospinal fluid. The coulometry process generates silver ions, which react with the chloride to form silver chloride (AgCl).

The first chloridometer was designed by a team led by Ernest Cotlove in 1958.

Other methods to determine chloride concentration include photometric titration and isotope dilution mass spectrometry.

== Operation ==
An amperostat delivers a constant current of about 6—8 mA to the generator electrodes for the titration of the solution, and a digital timer is started. A second pair of silver electrodes are used as a detector to measure the conductance of the solution. The same constant current is known to titrate a given number of moles $(n_{Cl^-})_s$ of a chloride standard solution in time $t_s$. Titration of the assay solution will result in the generation of insoluble silver chloride until the chloride ions are consumed, after which time an increase in silver ions will be detected at the detector electrodes. This time, $t_u$, is the titration time of the solution being measured. The concentration of chloride ions in this solution is then calculated as:

$$(n_{Cl^-})_u = {t_u \over t_s } \times (n_{Cl^-})_s$$

Although the absolute quantity of silver ions ($Ag^+$) required to react with the chloride ions can be determined using Faraday's laws of electrolysis, in practice calibration is required.

Silver ions are generated by oxidation at the anode when an electric potential is applied across the silver electrodes. This is the anodic reaction.

$$Ag \rightarrow Ag^+ +e^-$$

The silver ions enter the solution at a rate proportional to the electrical current. Because the current is constant, the rate of silver ion production is hence proportional to the time of current flow, and silver ions enter the solution at a constant rate from the silver wire anode. These ions react with the chloride ions in the titration reaction, resulting in insoluble silver chloride.

$$Ag^+ + Cl^- \rightarrow AgCl$$

The end point, which occurs when there are no more chloride ions with which silver ions may react, is detected by a pair of silver microelectrodes in the solution, which is connected in series with a microammeter. The increasing concentration of silver ions creates a current between the microelectrodes, activating a switch that shuts off power to the main electrodes and the timer, terminating the measurement. The duration of the titration is the titration time $t_s$, which is proportional to the amount of silver ions released, and hence to the amount of chloride in the assay solution.

== Uses ==
Chloridometers are used to determine the concentration of chloride ions in biological fluids. For example, fish plasma chloride ion concentration is measured to gauge the effects of stress on osmoregulation in aquacultures. A small quantity of plasma (10 μL) combined with an acid reagent results in a chemical reaction that ultimately provides a concentration measure of chloride ions in meq/L.

Because they require alternating current, chloridometers are not portable and are better suited to a "bench-top location". This may necessitate freezing biological fluid specimens collected in the field for later analysis.

Chloridometers represent the most common use of coulometry in clinical biochemistry.
