= Hofmann voltameter =

Device for electrolysing water

Hofmann voltameter

A Hofmann voltameter is an apparatus for electrolysing water, invented by August Wilhelm von Hofmann (1818–1892) in 1866. It consists of three joined upright cylinders, usually glass. The inner cylinder is open at the top to allow addition of water which contains a low concentration of a compound such as sulfuric acid to improve conductivity and complete the circuit. A platinum electrode is placed inside the bottom of each of the two side cylinders, connected to the positive and negative terminals of a source of electricity. When current is run through Hofmann's voltameter, gaseous oxygen forms at the anode and gaseous hydrogen at the cathode. Each gas displaces water and collects at the top of the two outer tubes.

The tubes which collect the product gases are usually graduated, so that the volume of gas can be measured.

== Name ==
The name 'voltameter' was coined by Daniell, who shortened Faraday's original name of "volta-electrometer". Hofmann voltameters are no longer used as electrical measuring devices. However, before the invention of the ammeter, voltameters were often used to measure direct current, since current through a voltameter with iron or copper electrodes electroplates the cathode with an amount of metal from the anode directly proportional to the total coulombs of charge transferred (Faraday's law of electrolysis). The modern name is "electrochemical coulometer". Although the correct spelling of Hofmann contains only one 'f', it is often incorrectly depicted as Hoffmann.

== Uses ==
The amount of electricity that has passed through the system can then be determined from the volume of gas. Thomas Edison used voltameters as electricity meters.

A Hofmann voltameter is often used as a demonstration of stoichiometric principles, as the two-to-one ratio of the volumes of hydrogen and oxygen gas produced by the apparatus illustrates the chemical formula of water, H_{2}O. However, this is only true if oxygen and hydrogen gases are assumed to be diatomic. If hydrogen gas were monatomic and oxygen diatomic, the gas volume ratio would be 4:1. The volumetric composition of water is the ratio by volume of hydrogen to oxygen present. This value is 2:1 experimentally; this value is determined using Hofmann's water voltameter.

== See also ==
- Timeline of hydrogen technologies
- Electrolysis of water
