= Copper–copper(II) sulfate electrode =

Class of electrodes

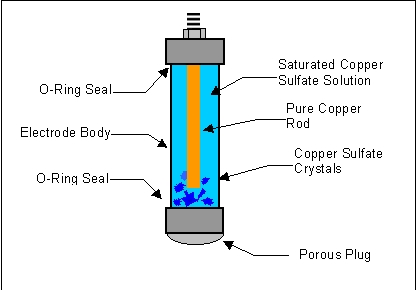
Diagram of an electrode used in the field

The copper–copper(II) sulfate electrode is a reference electrode of the first kind, based on the redox reaction with participation of the metal (copper) and its salt, copper(II) sulfate. It is used for measuring electrode potential and is the most commonly used reference electrode for testing cathodic protection corrosion control systems. The corresponding equation can be presented as follow:

Cu^{2+} + 2e^{−} → Cu^{0}(metal)

This reaction is characterized by reversible and fast electrode kinetics, meaning that a sufficiently high current can be passed through the electrode with 100% efficiency of the redox reaction (dissolution of the metal or cathodic deposition of the copper-ions).

The Nernst equation below shows the dependence of the potential of the copper-copper(II) sulfate electrode on the activity or concentration copper-ions:

$E=0.337 + \frac{RT}{2F} \ln a_{\rm Cu^{2+}}$

The potential of a copper–copper sulfate electrode is +0.314 volt with respect to the standard hydrogen electrode.

== Design ==
Commercial reference electrodes consist of a plastic tube holding the copper rod and saturated solution of copper sulfate. A porous plug on one end allows contact with the copper sulfate electrolyte. The copper rod protrudes out of the tube. The negative lead of a voltmeter is connected to the copper rod.

== Applications ==
A copper–copper(II) sulfate electrode is used as one of the half cells in the galvanic Daniel-Jakobi cell.

Copper-copper(II) sulfate electrodes are used in the Copper coulometer. It contains two identical copper electrodes immersed in a slightly acidic pH-buffered solution of copper(II) sulfate.
