= Ampere-hour =

Unit of electric charge

ampere-hour
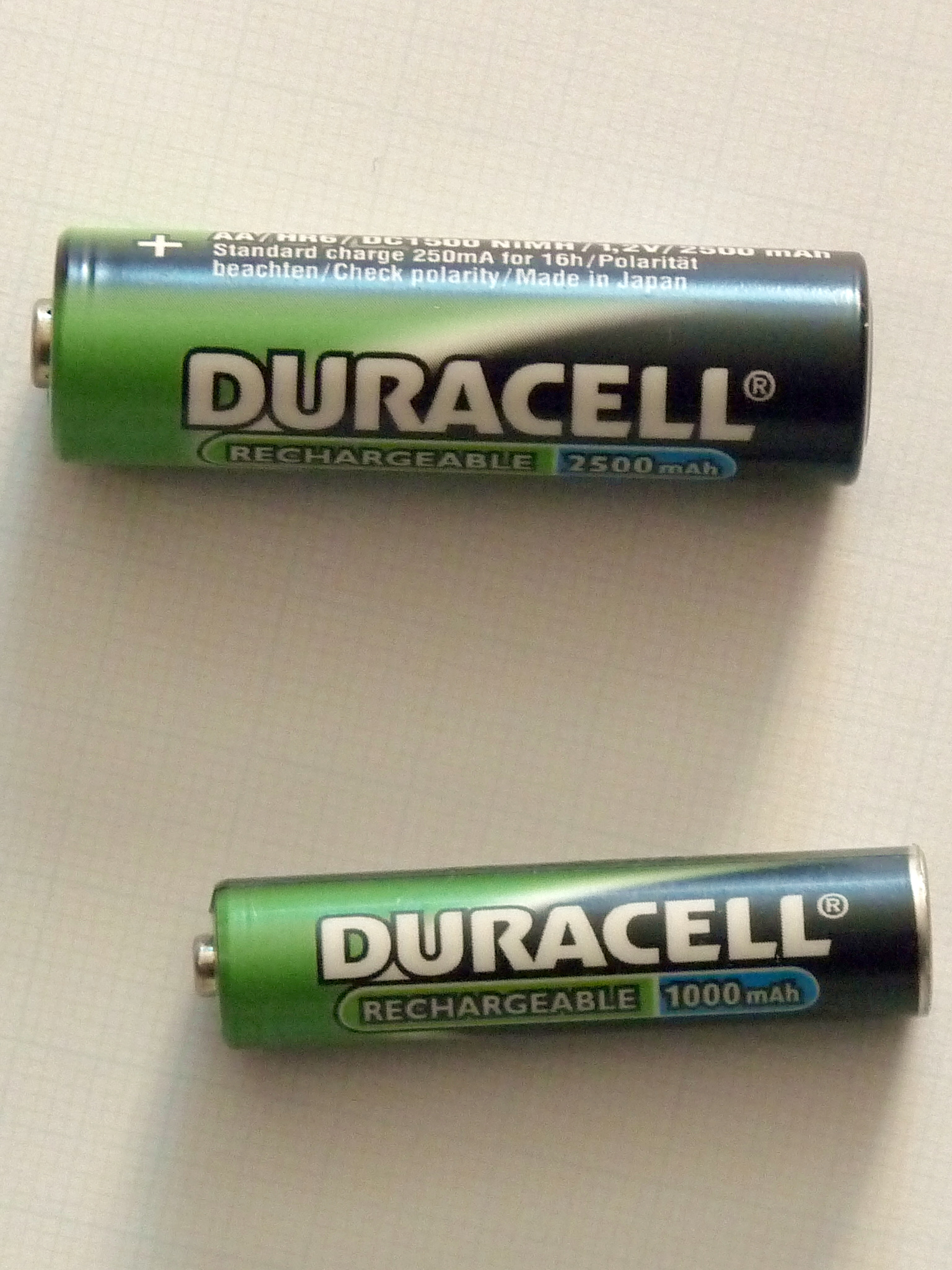
- Rechargeable NiMH 1.2 V batteries Top: AA battery (2500 mA⋅h); Bottom: AAA battery (1000 mA⋅h)

General information
- Unit system: Non-SI metric unit
- Unit of: Electric charge
- Symbol: A⋅h, A h

Conversions
1 A⋅h in ...	... is equal to ...
- SI units: 3600 C

An ampere-hour or amp-hour (symbol: A⋅h or A h, often simplified as Ah) is a unit of electric charge, recommended for use in batteries (in specifying their capacity) and electrolytic devices. It has dimensions of electric current multiplied by time and corresponds to the charge transferred by a steady current of one ampere flowing for one hour (3,600 seconds). Thus 1 A⋅h equals 3600 A⋅s or 3.6 kC (kilocoulombs).

The commonly seen milliampere-hour (symbol: mA⋅h or mA h, often simplified as mAh) is one-thousandth of an ampere-hour (3.6 C).

== Simple conceptual examples ==
These examples demonstrate the simple mathematical relationship. In practical usage there are far more factors to consider – see below.

- 0.5 A·h (500 mA·h) has an electrical charge with the equivalent* of supplying either:
  - 0.5 amperes for 1 hour
  - 1 ampere for half an hour
- 1 A·h (1000 mA·h) has an electrical charge with the equivalent* of supplying either:
  - 0.5 amperes for 2 hours
  - 1 ampere for 1 hour
  - 2 amperes for half an hour
- 2 A·h (2000 mA·h) has an electrical charge with the equivalent* of supplying either:
  - 0.5 amperes for 4 hours
  - 2 amperes for 1 hour
  - 4 amperes for half an hour

*Ampere-hours are a measurement of charge, not a measurement of application. The above examples are a useful reference, but in practice the usable output is not identical, and can vary greatly. For instance:

- Losses: Energy transfer is never 100% efficient, there is always some loss between energy stored and energy output, how much depends on the circumstances.
- Battery mechanics: Many batteries have a limitation on how low it can be discharged, for example lead acid leisure batteries usually should not be discharged more than 50% of their rated capacity.
- Current limitations: There are usually limits on the rate at which energy can be transferred. For example a 10 A·h battery will usually be capable of delivering approximately 0.5 amperes for 20 hours, but it might not be able to transfer 20 amperes for half an hour. As the current (in amperes) increases, there is increasing difficulty with the battery mechanics, cables, receiving device, etc., all being able to handle it; often in the form of heat and fire risk. Also as discharge current increases, capacity decreases (Peukert's law).

== Use ==
The ampere-hour is frequently used in measurements of electrochemical systems such as electroplating and for battery capacity where the commonly known nominal voltage is understood.

A milliampere second (mA⋅s) is a unit of measurement used in X-ray imaging, diagnostic imaging, and radiation therapy. It is equivalent to a millicoulomb. This quantity is proportional to the total X-ray energy produced by a given X-ray tube operated at a particular voltage. The same total dose can be delivered in different time periods depending on the X-ray tube current.

To help express energy, computation over charge values in ampere-hour requires precise data of voltage: in a battery system, for example, accurate calculation of the energy delivered requires integration of the power delivered (product of instantaneous voltage and instantaneous current) over the discharge interval. Generally, the battery voltage varies during discharge; an average value or nominal value may be used to approximate the integration of power.

When comparing the energy capacities of battery-based products that might have different internal cell chemistries or cell configurations, a simple ampere-hour rating is often insufficient.

== In other units of electric charge ==
One ampere-hour is equal to (up to 4 significant figures):

- 3600 coulombs
- 2.247 × 10^{22} elementary charges
- 0.03731 faradays
- 1.079 × 10^{13} statcoulombs (CGS-ESU equivalent)
- 360 abcoulombs (CGS-EMU equivalent)

== Practical Examples ==
- An AA size dry cell has a capacity of about 2000 to 3000 milliampere-hours.
- An average smartphone battery usually has between 2500 and 6000 milliampere-hours of rechargeable electric capacity.
- Automotive car starter batteries vary in capacity but a large automobile propelled by an internal combustion gasoline engine would have about a 50-ampere-hour 12 V battery capacity.
- Battery electric vehicle capacities are usually given in kW⋅h, but in 2013, the BMW i3 60 A⋅h was named after the capacity of one of its 96 cells, for a total of 96 × 3.6 V × 60 A⋅h = 20736 W⋅h with about 18 kW⋅h usable energy, to match the number of the entry level Tesla Model S60 which had 60 kW⋅h. Later BMW i3 had 94 A⋅h and 120 A⋅h batteries, each topping Tesla's S85, S90 and S100 designations.
- Since one ampere-hour can produce 0.336 grams of aluminium from molten aluminium chloride, producing a kilogram of aluminium required transfer of at least 2980 ampere-hours. One kilogram of aluminium commonly requires 15.37 kW⋅h, thus electric power represents about 20% to 40% of the cost of producing aluminium.

== Confusion with power ==
Many people buying or comparing batteries are not familiar with electrical concepts, which can lead to confusion between ampere-hours and watt-hours.

Amperes only measure current, not power. To calculate power, the current in amperes is multiplied by the voltage in volts to provide power in watts.

In other words, a 1 A·h (1000 mA·h) 1.5 V battery provides much less power than a 1 A·h 12 V battery.

== See also ==
- Electrochemical equivalent
- Kilowatt-hour (kW⋅h)
