= Faraday's law =

Faraday's law may refer to the following:

- Faraday's laws of electrolysis, relating electric charge to chemical change
- Faraday's law of induction, relating changing magnetic field to induced voltage or electric field
