= Copper coulometer =

Device measuring electric charge via copper deposition on electrodes

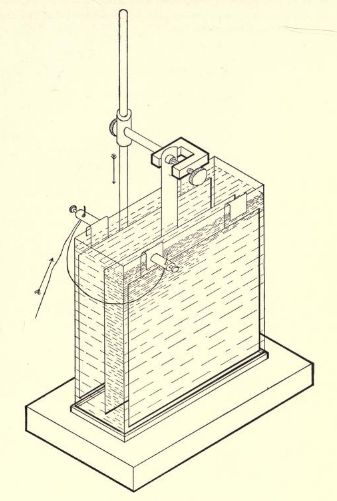
Copper coulometer

The copper coulometer is a coulometer consisting of two identical copper electrodes immersed in a slightly acidic pH-buffered solution of copper(II) sulfate (copper-copper(II) sulfate electrode). Passing of current through the element leads to the anodic dissolution of the metal on anode and simultaneous deposition of copper ions on the cathode. These reactions have 100% efficiency over a wide range of current density.

== Calculation ==
The amount of electric charge (quantity of electricity) passed through the cell can easily be determined by measuring the change in mass of either electrode and calculating:

$$Q = \frac{z_{Cu}\Delta m F}{M_{Cu}}$$,

where:

- $Q$ is the quantity of electricity (coulombs)
- $\Delta m$ is the mass transported (gm)
- $z_{Cu}$ is the charge of the copper ions, equal to +2
- $F$ is the Faraday constant (96485.3383 coulombs per mole)
- $M_{Cu}$ is the atomic weight of copper, equal to 63.546 grams per mole.

Although this apparatus is interesting from a theoretical and historical point of view, present-day electronic measurement of time and electric current provide in their multiplication the amount of passed coulombs much easier, with greater precision, and in a shorter period of time than is possible by weighing the electrodes.

== See also ==
- Mercury coulometer
- Coulometry
