= László Szebellédy =

Hungarian chemist (1901–1944)

László Szebellédy (20 April 1901 – 23 January 1944) was a Hungarian chemist who contributed to electrochemistry with the development of Coulometric analytical techniques for detecting small quantities of chemicals with precision. He served as a professor at Pázmány Péter University.

== Early life and career ==
Szebellédy was born in Rétság and went to the Pázmány Péter University where he studied pharmacy, and obtained a doctorate in 1926. He then joined as an assistant to Professor Lajos Winkler (1863–1939). In 1933 he became an assistant professor. He went to Zurich, Dresden and Leipzig, working at the laboratories of W. D. Treadwell, Max Le Blanc (1865-1943) and Wilhelm Böttger (1871–1949). In 1935-36 he taught chemical analysis and worked on microanalysis techniques involving dyes, fluorescence, indicators and catalysts.

== Achievements ==
He developed coulombetric (or coulometric) titration analysis along with Zoltán Somogyi (1915–1945) in 1938 where the volume of a chemical could be calculated using Faraday's laws.

== Death ==
He died at the age of 43, publishing more than a hundred papers.
