= Mercury coulometer =

Instrument for analyzing redox reactions involving mercury

Principle scheme of the mercury coulometer

In electrochemistry, a mercury coulometer is an analytical instrument which uses mercury to perform coulometry (determining the amount of matter transformed in a chemical reaction by measuring electric current) based on the following reaction:
$$\ce{Hg^2+} + \ce{2e^- <=> Hg^\circ}$$

These oxidation/reduction processes have 100% efficiency within a wide range of current densities. Measuring the quantity of electricity (coulombs) is conducted by measuring changes in the mass of the mercury electrode. The mass of the electrode can be increased during cathodic deposition of the mercury ions or decreased during the anodic dissolution of the metal.
$$Q = \frac{ 2 \, \Delta m \, F}{M_\ce{Hg}},$$
where Q is the quantity of electricity; Δm is the change in mass; F is the Faraday constant; and M_{Hg} is the molar mass of mercury.

== Use as Hour Meter ==
Before the development of solid-state electronics, coulometers (electrochemical hour meters, elapsed time indicators) were used as long-period (up to 25,000 hours) elapsed hour meters in electronic equipment and other devices, including on the Apollo Program space vehicles. By passing a constant, calibrated current through the coulometer, the movement of a gap between mercury droplets provides a visual indication of elapsed time. Brands included HP's Chronister and Curtis' Indachron.

== Construction ==
This coulometer has different constructions but all of them are based on mass measurements. The device consists of two reservoirs connected by a thin graduated capillary tube containing a solution of mercury(II) ions as an electrolyte. Each of the reservoirs contains an electrode immersed in a drop of mercury. Another small drop of mercury is inserted into the capillary. When the current is turned on, it initiates dissolution of the metallic mercury on one side of the drop in the capillary and deposition on the other side of the same drop. This drop starts to move. Because of the high efficiency of the deposition/dissolution of the mercury under the influence of current, the mass or volume of this small drop is constant and its movement is linearly correlated with the passed charge. If the direction of the current is changed, the drop moves in the opposite direction. The sensitivity of this type of coulometer depends on the diameter of the capillary.

Another construction is to only have a capillary filled with mercury and electrodes on both sides, with the mercury being separated into two areas by a small electrolyte bubble with a glass tube in the bubble, parallel to the capillary. The capillary is graduated to act as a time meter.

== See also ==
- Copper coulometer
