= Staircase voltammetry =

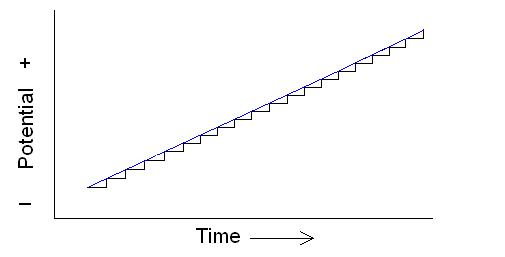
Staircase potential sweep (black) set against a linear potential sweep (blue)

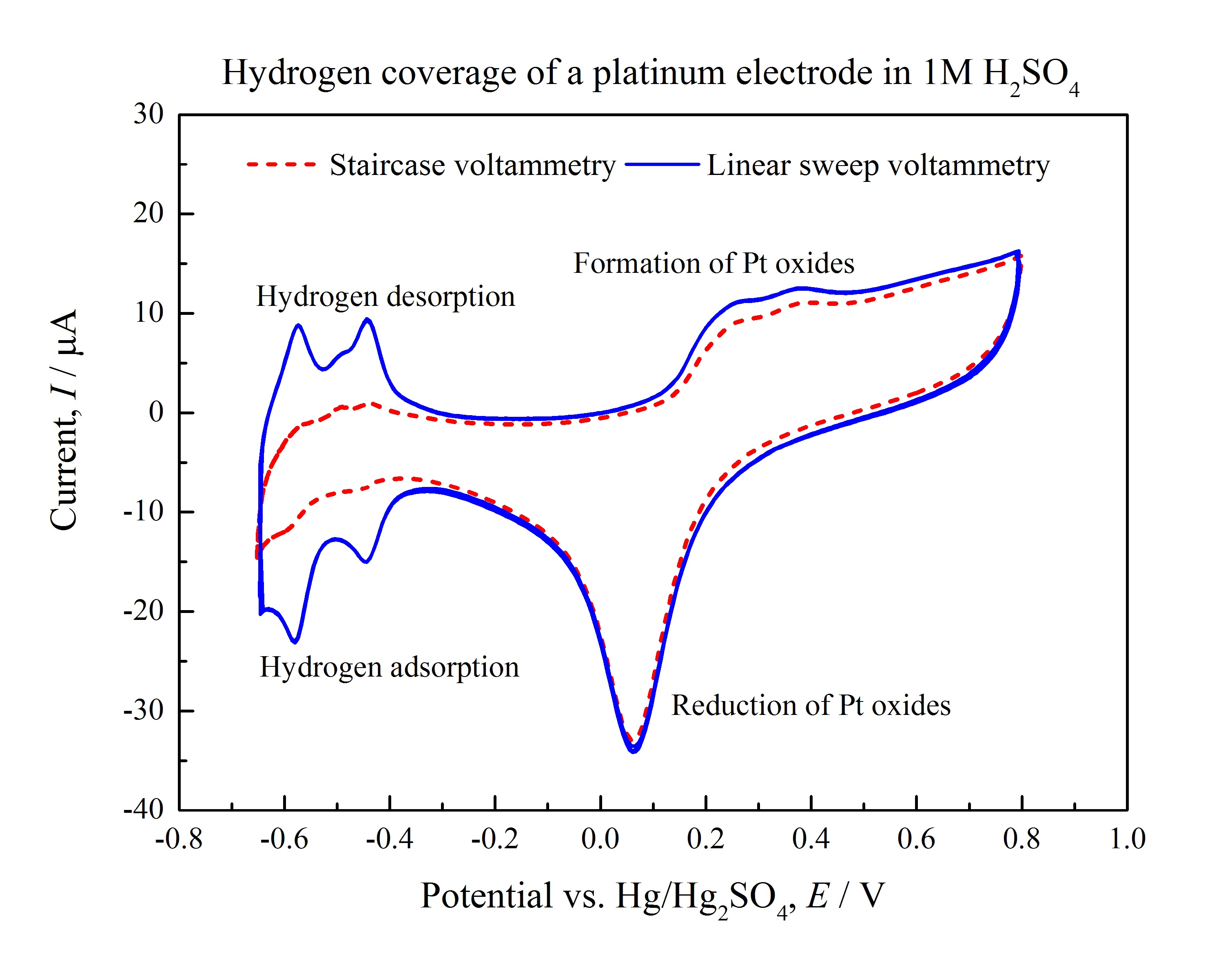
Comparison of the current response of a platinum disc electrode in 1 M sulphuric acid given by linear sweep voltammetry and staircase voltammetry methods.

Staircase voltammetry is a derivative of linear sweep voltammetry. In linear sweep voltammetry the current at a working electrode is measured while the potential between the working electrode and a reference electrode is swept linearly in time. Oxidation or reduction of species is registered as a peak or trough in the current signal at the potential at which the species begins to be oxidized or reduced.

In staircase voltammetry, the potential sweep is a series of stair steps. The current is measured at the end of each potential change, right before the next, so that the contribution to the current signal from the capacitive charging current is reduced.

== See also ==
- Voltammetry
- Electroanalytical methods
- Squarewave voltammetry
