= Janet G. Osteryoung =

American chemist (1939–2021)

Janet Gretchen Osteryoung
- Born: Janet Gretchen Jones; March 1, 1939; Pittsburgh, Pennsylvania
- Died: September 21, 2021 (aged 82); Mitchellville, Maryland
- Education: Swarthmore College; California Institute of Technology
- Scientific career
- Workplaces: National Science Foundation; North Carolina State University; State University of New York at Buffalo; University of Southampton; Colorado State University; Montana State University
- Thesis: Ligand bridging in the oxidation of chromium(II) at mercury electrodes (1967)

Janet Gretchen Osteryoung (March 1, 1939 – September 21, 2021) was an American chemist who was the director of the Chemistry Division of the National Science Foundation from 1994 to 2001. Her research furthered the development of electroanalysis and especially that of square wave voltammetry. She was elected a Fellow of the American Association for the Advancement of Science in 1984 and awarded the Garvan–Olin Medal in 1987.

== Early life and education ==
Janet Gretchen Jones was born in Pittsburgh, Pennsylvania, and grew up in Vero Beach, Florida. She was an undergraduate student at Swarthmore College, where she was a Merit scholar. Jones was a graduate student at California Institute of Technology, where she worked alongside Fred Anson on ligand bridging in charge transfer reactions. Robert Osteryoung was a Visiting Associate in the Department of Chemistry at Caltech at this same time. After marrying, Janet and Robert Osteryoung both continued to carry out research in the field of electroanalytical chemistry.

== Research and career ==
Osteryoung was appointed to the faculty at Montana State University in 1967. She moved to Colorado State University a year later, where she worked in the Departments of Civil Engineering and Microbiology. In 1977, Osteryoung moved to the National Science Foundation, where she was the program director for chemical analysis.

Osteryoung was made associate professor at the State University of New York at Buffalo in 1979 and professor in 1982. In 1985 Osteryoung was awarded a Guggenheim Fellowship and spent a year at the University of Southampton, where she investigated the fundamentals of solid electrodes.

Osteryoung moved to North Carolina State University in 1992, where she served as head of department for two years. In 1994, she returned to the National Science Foundation, where she was made director of the division of chemistry. She was the first woman to win the Jacob F. Schoellkopf medal in 1992.

== Awards and honors ==
- 1984 Elected Fellow of the American Association for the Advancement of Science
- 1985 Guggenheim Fellowship
- 1986 Honorary Fulbright Fellow
- 1987 American Chemical Society Garvan–Olin Medal
- 1990 Anachem Award
- 1990 Honorary member of Iota Sigma Pi
- 1992 Jacob F. Schoellkopf Medal
- 1996 American Chemical Society Division of Analytical Chemistry Award in Electrochemistry
- 1998 Society for Analytical Chemists of Pittsburgh Analytical Chemistry Award
- 1999 The Society for Electroanalytical Chemistry Charles N. Reilley Award in Electroanalytical Chemistry

== Selected publications ==
- Osteryoung, Janet G.; Osteryoung, Robert A. (1985-01-01). "Square wave voltammetry". Analytical Chemistry. 57 (1): 101–110. doi:10.1021/ac00279a004. ISSN 0003-2700.
- Aoki, Koichi; Akimoto, Koji; Tokuda, Koichi; Matsuda, Hiroaki; Osteryoung, Janet (1984-08-10). "Linear sweep voltammetry at very small stationary disk electrodes". Journal of Electroanalytical Chemistry and Interfacial Electrochemistry. 171 (1): 219–230. doi:10.1016/0022-0728(84)80115-1. ISSN 0022-0728.
- O'Dea, John J.; Osteryoung, Janet G. (1993-11-01). "Characterization of quasi-reversible surface processes by square-wave voltammetry". Analytical Chemistry. 65 (21): 3090–3097. doi:10.1021/ac00069a024. ISSN 0003-2700.

== Personal life ==
Janet Jones was once married to Robert Osteryoung, who was also an award-winning chemist. In April 2010, she married Chris Cobb in Washington, D.C. Together, Jones and Cobb established the Comis Foundation, a family philanthropic foundation to benefit children and youth.
