= Potentiostat =

Electronic system controlling a three electrode cell

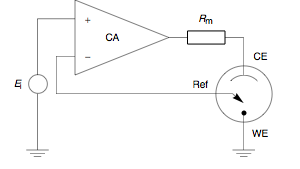
Fig. 1 : Schematic of a potentiostat.

A potentiostat is the electronic hardware required to control a three electrode cell and run most electroanalytical experiments. A Bipotentiostat and polypotentiostat are potentiostats capable of controlling two working electrodes and more than two working electrodes, respectively.

The system functions by maintaining the potential of the working electrode at a constant level with respect to the reference electrode by adjusting the current at an auxiliary electrode. The heart of the different potentiostatic electronic circuits is an operational amplifier (op amp). It consists of an electric circuit which is usually described in terms of simple op amps.

== Primary use ==
This equipment is fundamental to modern electrochemical studies using three electrode systems for investigations of reaction mechanisms related to redox chemistry and other chemical phenomena. The dimensions of the resulting data depend on the experiment. In voltammetry, electric current in amps is plotted against electric potential in voltage. In a bulk electrolysis total coulombs passed (total electric charge) is plotted against time in seconds even though the experiment measures electric current (amperes) over time. This is done to show that the experiment is approaching an expected number of coulombs.

Most early potentiostats could function independently, providing data output through a physical data trace. Modern potentiostats are designed to interface with a personal computer and operate through a dedicated software package. The automated software allows the user rapidly to shift between experiments and experimental conditions. The computer allows data to be stored and analyzed more effectively, rapidly, and accurately than the earlier standalone devices.

== Basic relationships ==
A potentiostat is a control and measuring device. It comprises an electric circuit which controls the potential across the cell by sensing changes in its resistance, varying accordingly the current supplied to the system: a higher resistance will result in a decreased current, while a lower resistance will result in an increased current, in order to keep the voltage constant as described by Ohm's law.

$${R} = {E \over I}$$

As a result, the variable system resistance and the controlled current are inversely proportional

$I_o={E_c \over R_v}$
- $I_o$ is the output electric current of the potentiostat
- $E_c$ is the voltage that is kept constant
- $R_v$ is the electrical resistance that varies.

== Principles of operation ==
Since 1942, when the English electrochemist Archie Hickling (University of Leicester) built the first three electrode potentiostat, substantial progress has been made to improve the instrument. Hickling's device used a third electrode, the reference electrode to control the cell potential automatically. Up until the present day his principle has remained in use. At a glance, a potentiostat measures the potential difference between the working and the reference electrode, applies the current through the counter electrode and measures the current as an $i$ $R$ voltage drop over a series resistor ($R_{\textrm m}$ in Fig. 1).

The control amplifier (CA) is responsible for maintaining the voltage between the reference and the working electrode as closely as possible to the voltage of the input source $E_{\textrm i}$. It adjusts its output to automatically control the cell current so that a condition of equilibrium is satisfied. The theory of operation is best understood using the equations below.

Prior to observing the following equations, one may note that, from an electrical point of view, the electrochemical cell and the current measurement resistor $R_{\textrm m}$ may be regarded as two impedances (Fig. 2). $Z_1$ includes $R_{\textrm m}$ in series with the interfacial impedance of the counter electrode and the solution resistance between the counter and the reference. $Z_2$ represents the interfacial impedance of the working electrode in series with the solution resistance between the working and the reference electrodes.

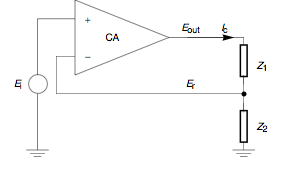
Fig. 2 : Schematic of a potentiostat, with electrochemical cell replaced by two impedances.

The role of the control amplifier is to amplify the potential difference between the positive (or noninverting) input and the negative (or inverting) input. This may be translated mathematically into the following equation:

$E_{\textrm{out}}=A\,(E^+-E^-)=A\,(E_{\textrm i}-E_{\textrm r})$. (1)

where $A$ is the amplification factor of the CA. At this point the assumption may be made that a negligible amount of current is flowing through the reference electrode. This correlates to physical phenomenon since the reference electrode is connected to a high impedance electrometer. Thus, the cell current may be described in two ways:

$I_{\textrm c}=\frac{E_{\textrm{out}}}{Z_1+Z_2}$(2)

and

$I_{\textrm c}=\frac{E_{\textrm r}}{Z_2}$. (3)

Combining Eqs. (2) and (3) yields Eq. (4):

$E_{\textrm r}=\frac{Z_2}{Z_1+Z_2}\,E_{\textrm{out}}=\beta\,E_{\textrm{out}}$ (4)

where $\beta$ is the fraction of the output voltage of the control amplifier returned to its negative input; namely the feedback factor:

$$\beta=\frac{Z_2}{Z_1+Z_2}$$.

Combining Eqs. (1) and (4) yields Eq. (6):

$\frac{E_{\textrm r}}{E_{\textrm i}}=\frac{\beta\,A}{1+\beta\,A}$. (6)

When the quantity $\beta$ $A$ becomes very large with respect to one, Eq. (6) reduces to Eq. (7), which is one of the negative feedback equations:

$E_{\textrm i}=E_{\textrm r}$. (7)

Eq. (7) proves that the control amplifier works to keep the voltage between the reference and the working close to the input source voltage.

== Software control ==
Replacing the CA, a control algorithm can maintain a constant voltage $E_{\textrm c}$ between the reference electrode and the working electrode. This algorithm is based on the rule of proportion:

$\frac{U_{\textrm m}}{E_{\textrm c}} = \frac{U_{\textrm n}}{E_{\textrm {SP}}}$. (8)

- $U_{\textrm m}$ is the last measured cell voltage between the working electrode (WE) and the counter electrode (CE).
- $E_{\textrm c}$ is the last measured electrochemical potential, i.e. the voltage between the reference electrode and WE to be kept constant.
- $U_{\textrm n}$ is the next cell voltage to be set, i.e. the controller output.
- $E_{\textrm {SP}}$ is the setpoint, i.e. the desired $E_{\textrm c}$.

If the measurement intervals of Eq. (8) are kept constant, the control algorithm sets the cell voltage $U_{\textrm m}$ so to keep $E_{\textrm c}$ as close as possible to the setpoint $E_{\textrm {SP}}$. The algorithm requires software-controllable hardware such as a digital multimeter, a power supply, and a double-pole double-throw relay. The relay is necessary to switch polarity.

== Significant features ==
In electrochemical experiments the electrodes are the pieces of equipment that comes in immediate contact with the analyte. For this reason the electrodes are very important for determining the experimental result. The electrode surface may or may not catalyze chemical reactions. The size of the electrodes affects the magnitude of the currents passed which can affect signal to noise. But electrodes are not the only limiting factor for electrochemical experiments, the potentiostat also has a limited range of operation. The following are a few significant features that vary between instruments.

- Electric potential range (measured and applied): while the potential window is mostly based on the solvent window the electronics can also limit the possible range.
- Accuracy in potential (measured and applied): limits of deviations between the actual and reported.
- Range of scan rate: how slow or fast a potential window can be scanned. This is most important for experiments that require high scan rates such as those involving ultramicroelectrodes.
- Sample rate: the rate at which potential or voltage can be accurately sampled. This can be important for experiments that need high scan rates such as those involving ultramicroelectrodes.
- File size: a limiting factor can be the file size limit. This would most likely affect the choice of the potential range swept or the potential sample rate.
- Electric current range (measured and applied): the maximum range over which current can be sampled. Applying large currents is important for experiments that pass a great deal of current like a large bulk electrolysis. Measuring small currents is important for experiments that pass small currents like those involving ultramicroelectrodes.
- Current resolution: determines the operational range of a specific experiment and the bit resolution of that data in the current dimension.
- Accuracy in current (measured and applied): limits of deviations between the actual and reported.
- Number of working channels: how many working electrodes can the instrument control. A bipotentiostat is necessary to controlling systems with two working electrodes like a rotating ring-disk electrode. A polypotentiostat may be important for controlling some biological experiments with three or more working electrodes. In conjunction with a Zero Resistance Ammeter per electrode many polarisations can be monitored at the same time in the same cell around the he couple potential. If the Zero Resistance Ammeters have an offsetting ability, then multiple tests can be achieved at the same time in the same test cell around the individual rest potential of each electrode. Such features can be useful for corrosion monitoring of coated electrodes or segmented but otherwise coupled welds.
- Footprint: potentiostats include small devices of about 20 x 10 x 5 cm weighing well under a kilogram or a simple board that can be installed in a desktop computer. A large bench-top model would be on the order of 50 x 20 x 10 cm and weigh up to or more than 5 kilograms.
- Interface: can the instrument run independently or must it be slaved to a personal computer.
- Sweep generator: can the system apply an analogue sweep or does it use a digital staircase generator as an approximation. If it does use a digital staircase then the resolution of the staircase is important.
- Rotating electrode: can the instrument operate a rotating electrode. This is intrinsic for experiments that require a rotating disk electrode or rotating ring-disk electrode.

== See also ==
- Amperostat
- Coulometry
- Electroanalytical method
- Galvanostat
- Operational amplifier
- Polarography
- Potentiometry
- Voltammetry
