= Chloride =

Main anion present in sea water

Chloride anion

Names
- Systematic IUPAC name Chloride

Identifiers
| CAS Number | 16887-00-6 |
| 3D model (JSmol) | Interactive image |
| Beilstein Reference | 3587171 |
| ChEBI | CHEBI:17996 |
| ChEMBL | ChEMBL19429 |
| ChemSpider | 306 |
| Gmelin Reference | 14910 |
| IUPHAR/BPS | 2339 |
| KEGG | C00698 |
| PubChem CID | 312 |
| UNII | Q32ZN48698 |
- InChI: InChI=1S/ClH/h1H/p-1 Key: VEXZGXHMUGYJMC-UHFFFAOYSA-M
- SMILES: [Cl-]

Properties
| Chemical formula | Cl^{−} |
| Molar mass | 35.45 g·mol^{−1} |
| Conjugate acid | Hydrogen chloride |

Thermochemistry
| Std molar entropy (S^{⦵}_{298}) | 153.36 J K^{−1} mol^{−1} |
| Std enthalpy of formation (Δ_{f}H^{⦵}_{298}) | −167 kJ mol^{−1} |

Related compounds
| Other anions | Fluoride; Bromide; Iodide |
- Except where otherwise noted, data are given for materials in their standard state (at 25 °C [77 °F], 100 kPa). Infobox references

The chloride /ˈklɔːraɪd/ ion (Cl^{−}) is the anion of chlorine, that is, chlorine with an extra electron. The term "chloride" is also used non-systematically for chemicals containing chlorine covalently bonded to another atom.

Chloride salts such as sodium chloride are often soluble in water. It is an essential electrolyte located in all body fluids responsible for maintaining acid/base balance, transmitting nerve impulses and regulating liquid flow in and out of cells. Other examples of ionic chlorides include potassium chloride (KCl), calcium chloride (CaCl_{2}), and ammonium chloride (NH_{4}Cl). Examples of covalent chlorides include methyl chloride (CH_{3}Cl), carbon tetrachloride (CCl_{4}), sulfuryl chloride (SO_{2}Cl_{2}), and monochloramine (NH_{2}Cl).

== Electronic properties ==
A chloride ion (diameter 181 pm) is much larger than a chlorine atom (diameter 99 pm). The chlorine atom's hold on the valence shell is weaker because the chloride anion has one more electron than it does. The ion is colorless and diamagnetic. In aqueous solution, it is highly soluble in most cases; however, for some chloride salts, such as silver chloride, lead(II) chloride, and mercury(I) chloride, they are only slightly soluble in water. In aqueous solution, chloride is bonded by the protic end of the water molecules.

== Reactions of chloride ==
Chloride can be oxidized but not reduced. The first oxidation, as employed in the chlor-alkali process, is conversion to chlorine gas. Chlorine can be further oxidized to other oxides and oxyanions including hypochlorite (ClO^{−}, the active ingredient in chlorine bleach), chlorine dioxide (ClO_{2}), chlorate (ClO_{3}^{−}), and perchlorate (ClO_{4}^{−}).

In terms of its acid–base properties, chloride is a weak base as indicated by the negative value of the pK_{a} of hydrochloric acid. Chloride can be protonated by strong acids, such as sulfuric acid:

NaCl + H_{2}SO_{4} → NaHSO_{4} + HCl

Ionic chloride salts react with other salts to exchange anions. The presence of halide ions like chloride can be detected using silver nitrate. A solution containing chloride ions will produce a white silver chloride precipitate:

Cl^{−} + Ag^{+} → AgCl

The concentration of chloride in an assay can be determined using a chloridometer, which detects silver ions once all chloride in the assay has precipitated via this reaction.

Chlorided silver electrodes are commonly used in ex vivo electrophysiology.

== Other oxyanions ==
Chlorine can assume oxidation states of −1, +1, +3, +5, or +7. Several neutral chlorine oxides are also known.

| Chlorine oxidation state | −1 | +1 | +3 | +5 | +7 |
| Name | chloride | hypochlorite | chlorite | chlorate | perchlorate |
| Formula | Cl^{−} | ClO^{−} | ClO_{2}^{−} | ClO_{3}^{−} | ClO_{4}^{−} |
| Structure | The chloride ion | The hypochlorite ion | The chlorite ion | The chlorate ion | The perchlorate ion |

== Occurrence in nature ==
In nature, chloride is found primarily in seawater, which has a chloride ion concentration of 19400 mg/liter. Smaller quantities, though at higher concentrations, occur in certain inland seas and in subterranean brine wells, such as the Great Salt Lake in Utah and the Dead Sea in Israel. Most chloride salts are soluble in water, thus, chloride-containing minerals are usually only found in abundance in dry climates or deep underground. Some chloride-containing minerals include halite (sodium chloride NaCl), sylvite (potassium chloride KCl), bischofite (MgCl_{2}·6H_{2}O), carnallite (KCl·MgCl_{2}·6H_{2}O), and kainite (KCl·MgSO_{4}·3H_{2}O). It is also found in evaporite minerals such as chlorapatite and sodalite.

=== Role in biology ===
Chloride has a major physiological significance, which includes regulation of osmotic pressure, electrolyte balance and acid-base homeostasis. Chloride is present in all body fluids, and is the most abundant extracellular anion which accounts for around one third of extracellular fluid's tonicity.

Chloride is an essential electrolyte, playing a key role in maintaining cell homeostasis and transmitting action potentials in neurons. It can flow through chloride channels (including the GABA_{A} receptor) and is transported by KCC2 and NKCC2 transporters.

Chloride is usually (though not always) at a higher extracellular concentration, causing it to have a negative reversal potential (around −61 mV at 37 °C in a mammalian cell). Characteristic concentrations of chloride in model organisms are: in both E. coli and budding yeast are 10–200 mM (dependent on medium), in mammalian cells 5–100 mM and in blood plasma 100 mM.

Chloride is also needed for the production of hydrochloric acid in the stomach.

The concentration of chloride in the blood is called serum chloride, and this concentration is regulated by the kidneys. A chloride ion is a structural component of some proteins; for example, it is present in the amylase enzyme. For these roles, chloride is one of the essential dietary minerals (listed by its element name chlorine). Serum chloride levels are mainly regulated by the kidneys through a variety of transporters that are present along the nephron. Most of the chloride, which is filtered by the glomerulus, is reabsorbed by both proximal and distal tubules (majorly by proximal tubule) by both active and passive transport.

=== Corrosion ===
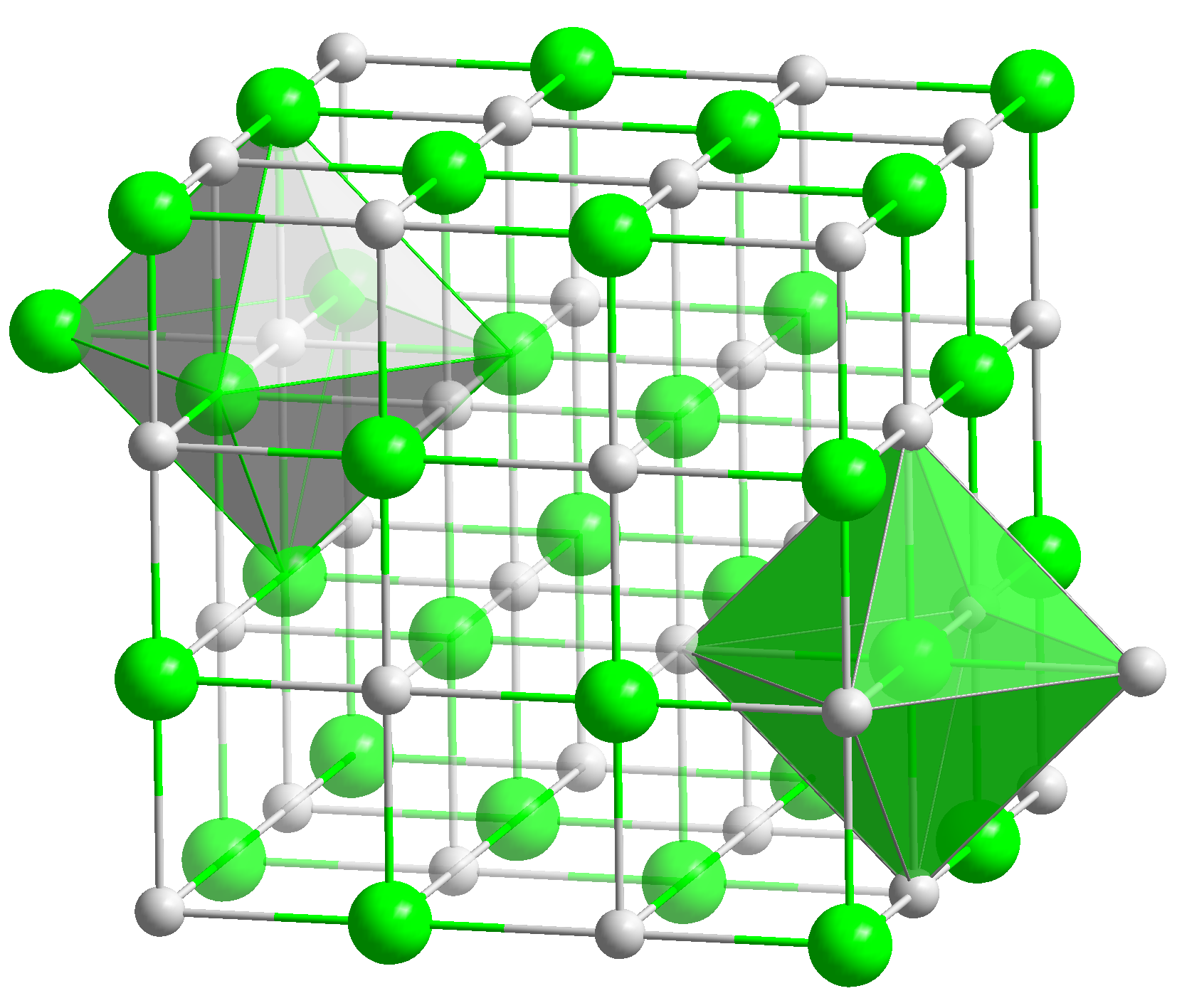
The structure of sodium chloride, revealing the tendency of chloride ions (green spheres) to link to several cations.

The presence of chlorides, such as in seawater, significantly worsens the conditions for pitting corrosion of most metals (including stainless steels, aluminum and high-alloyed materials). Chloride-induced corrosion of steel in concrete leads to a local breakdown of the protective oxide form in alkaline concrete, so that a subsequent localized corrosion attack takes place.

=== Environmental threats ===
Increased concentrations of chloride can cause a number of ecological effects in both aquatic and terrestrial environments. It may contribute to the acidification of streams, mobilize radioactive soil metals by ion exchange, affect the mortality and reproduction of aquatic plants and animals, promote the invasion of saltwater organisms into previously freshwater environments, and interfere with the natural mixing of lakes. Sodium chloride has been shown to change the composition of microbial species at relatively low concentrations, hinder the denitrification process, a microbial process essential to nitrate removal and the conservation of water quality, and inhibit the nitrification and respiration of organic matter.

== Production ==
The chlor-alkali industry is a major consumer of the world's energy budget. This process converts concentrated sodium chloride solutions into chlorine and sodium hydroxide, which are used to make many other materials and chemicals. The process involves two parallel reactions:

2 Cl^{−} → Cl_{2} + 2 e^{−}
2 H_{2}O + 2 e^{−} → H_{2} + 2 OH^{−}

Basic membrane cell used in the electrolysis of brine. At the anode (A), chloride (Cl^{−}) is oxidized to chlorine. The ion-selective membrane (B) allows the counterion Na^{+} to freely flow across, but prevents anions such as hydroxide (OH^{−}) and chloride from diffusing across. At the cathode (C), water is reduced to hydroxide and hydrogen gas.

== Examples and uses ==
An example is table salt, which is sodium chloride with the chemical formula NaCl. In water, it dissociates into Na^{+} and Cl^{−} ions. Salts such as calcium chloride, magnesium chloride, potassium chloride have varied uses ranging from medical treatments to cement formation.

Calcium chloride (CaCl_{2}) is a salt that is marketed in pellet form for removing dampness from rooms and lawn care. Calcium chloride is also used for maintaining unpaved roads and for fortifying roadbases for new construction. In addition, calcium chloride is widely used as a de-icer, since it is effective in lowering the melting point when applied to ice.

Examples of covalently-bonded chlorides are phosphorus trichloride, phosphorus pentachloride, and thionyl chloride, all three of which are reactive chlorinating reagents.

=== Water quality and processing ===
A major application involving chloride is desalination, which involves the energy intensive removal of chloride salts to give potable water. In the petroleum industry, the chlorides are a closely monitored constituent of the mud system. An increase of the chlorides in the mud system may be an indication of drilling into a high-pressure saltwater formation. Its increase can also indicate the poor quality of a target sand.

Chloride is also a useful and reliable chemical indicator of river and groundwater fecal contamination, as chloride is a non-reactive solute and ubiquitous to sewage and potable water. Many water regulating companies around the world utilize chloride to check the contamination levels of the rivers and potable water sources.

=== Food ===
Chloride salts such as sodium chloride are used to preserve food and as nutrients or condiments.

== See also ==
- Halide
- Renal chloride reabsorption
