= Linear sweep voltammetry =

Method of analyzing electrochemical reactions

Linear potential sweep

In analytical chemistry, linear sweep voltammetry is a method of voltammetry where the current at a working electrode is measured while the potential between the working electrode and a reference electrode is swept linearly in time. Oxidation or reduction of species is registered as a peak or trough in the current signal at the potential at which the species begins to be oxidized or reduced.

== Experimental method ==
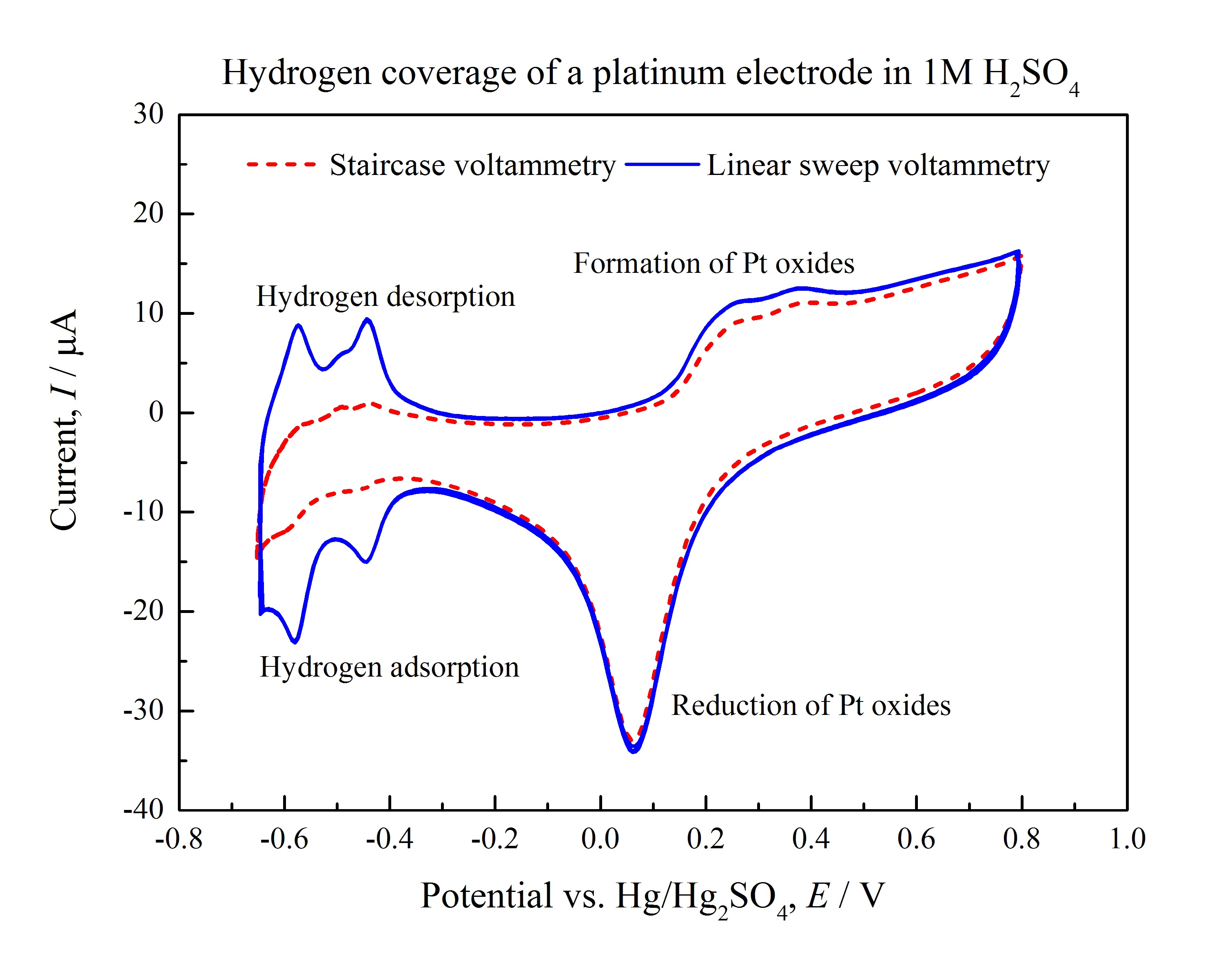
Comparison of the current response of a platinum disc electrode in 1 M sulphuric acid given by linear sweep cyclic voltammetry and staircase cyclic voltammetry methods. Staircase voltammetry suppresses the non-faradaic adsorption of hydrogen.

The experimental setup for linear sweep voltammetry utilizes a potentiostat and a three-electrode setup to deliver a potential to a solution and monitor its change in current. The three-electrode setup consists of a working electrode, an auxiliary electrode, and a reference electrode. The potentiostat delivers the potentials through the three-electrode setup. A potential, E, is delivered through the working electrode. The slope of the potential vs. time graph is called the scan rate and can range from mV/s to 1,000,000 V/s. The working electrode is one of the electrodes at which the oxidation/reduction reactions occur—the processes that occur at this electrode are the ones being monitored. The auxiliary electrode (or counter electrode) is the one at which a process opposite from the one taking place at the working electrode occurs. The processes at this electrode are not monitored. The equation below gives an example of a reduction occurring at the surface of the working electrode. E_{s} is the reduction potential of A (if the electrolyte and the electrode are in their standard conditions, then this potential is a standard reduction potential). As E approaches E_{s}, the current on the surface increases, and when E = E_{s}, the concentration of A equals that of the oxidized/reduced A at the surface ([A] = [A^{−}]). As the molecules on the surface of the working electrode are oxidized/reduced, they move away from the surface and new molecules come into contact with the surface of the working electrode. The flow of electrons into or out of the electrode causes the current. The current is a direct measure of the rate at which electrons are being exchanged through the electrode-electrolyte interface. When this rate becomes higher than the rate at which the oxidizing or reducing species can diffuse from the bulk of the electrolyte to the surface of the electrode, the current reaches a plateau or exhibits a peak:

$$\ce{A + e- <=> A-},\ E_s=0.00V$$

Reduction of molecule A at the surface of the working electrode.

The auxiliary and reference electrode work in unison to balance out the charge added or removed by the working electrode. The auxiliary electrode balances the working electrode, but in order to know how much potential it has to add or remove it relies on the reference electrode. The reference electrode has a known reduction potential. The auxiliary electrode tries to keep the reference electrode at a certain reduction potential and to do this it has to balance the working electrode.

== Characterization ==
Linear sweep voltammetry can identify unknown species and determine the concentration of solutions. E1/2 can be used to identify the unknown species while the height of the limiting current can determine the concentration. The sensitivity of current changes vs. voltage can be increased by increasing the scan rate. Higher potentials per second result in more oxidation/reduction of a species at the surface of the working electrode.

== Variations ==
For reversible reactions cyclic voltammetry can be used to find information about the forward reaction and the reverse reaction. Like linear sweep voltammetry, cyclic voltammetry applies a linear potential over time and at a certain potential the potentiostat will reverse the potential applied and sweep back to the beginning point. Cyclic voltammetry provides information about the oxidation and reduction reactions.

== Applications ==
While cyclic voltammetry is applicable to most cases where linear sweep voltammetry is used, there are some instances where linear sweep voltammetry is more useful. In cases where the reaction is irreversible cyclic voltammetry will not give any additional data that linear sweep voltammetry would give us. In one example, linear voltammetry was used to examine direct methane production via a biocathode. Since the production of methane from CO_{2} is an irreversible reaction, cyclic voltammetry did not present any distinct advantage over linear sweep voltammetry. This group found that the biocathode produced higher current densities than a plain carbon cathode and that methane can be produced from a direct electric current without the need of hydrogen gas.

== See also ==
- Voltammetry
- Cyclic voltammetry
- Electroanalytical methods
