= Galvanostat =

Instrument used in electrochemistry

A galvanostat (also known as amperostat) is a control and measuring device capable of keeping the current through an electrolytic cell in coulometric titrations constant, disregarding changes in the load itself.

Its main feature is its nearly "infinite" (i.e. extremely high in respect to common loads) internal resistance.

The designation "galvanostat" is mainly used in electrochemistry: this device differs from common constant current sources by its ability to supply and measure a wide range of currents (from picoamperes to amperes) of both polarities.

The galvanostat responds to changes in the resistance of the cell by varying its output potential: as Ohm's law shows,

$${R} = {U \over I}$$

the variable system resistance and the controlled voltage are directly proportional, i.e.

$$U_c ={R_v \times I_o}$$

where

- $I_o$ is the electric current that is kept constant
- $U_c$ is the output control voltage of the amperostat
- $R_v$ is the electrical resistance that varies;

thus, an increase of the load resistance implies an increase of the voltage the amperostat applies to the load.

== Technical realization ==
The simpler galvanostat consists of a high-voltage source producing a constant voltage $U$ with a resistor $R_{x}$ connected in series: in order to force an almost constant current through a load, this resistor shall be much higher than the load resistor $R_{load}$. As a matter of fact, the current $I$ through the load is given by

$$I = \frac{U}{R_x + R_{load}}$$

and if $R_x$>>$R_{load}$, the current $I$ is approximately determined by $R_x$ as follows

$$I \cong \frac{U}{R_x}$$

This simple realization requires rather high voltages (~100 V) to keep the load current constant with sufficient approximation for all practical purposes. Therefore, more complex versions of galvanostats, using electronic amplifiers with feedback and lower voltages, have been developed and produced. These instruments are capable to feed constant currents in the ranges from few picoamperes (pA) to several amperes (A); typical construction for use in the lower range of feed currents uses operational amplifiers.

== Example of application ==
Galvanostatic deposition techniques can be used for some thin film deposition applications where there is no need to control morphology of the thin film.

== See also ==
- Current source
- Potentiostat
