= Electrochemical equivalent =

Mass deposited per unit charge

In Electrochemistry, the electrochemical equivalent (Eq or Z) of a chemical element is the mass of that element (in grams) transported by a specific quantity of electricity, usually expressed in grams per coulomb of electric charge. The electrochemical equivalent of an element is measured with a voltameter.

== Definition ==
The electrochemical equivalent of a substance is the mass of the substance deposited to one of the electrodes when a current of 1 ampere is passed for 1 second, i.e. a quantity of electricity of one coulomb is passed.

This is a useful experimental quantity as it helps in many calculations in electrochemistry.

The formula for finding electrochemical equivalent is as follows:

$$Z = M/q$$

where $M$ is the mass of substance and $q$ is the charge passed. Since $q=It$, where $I$ is the current applied and $t$ is time, we also have

$$Z=M/It$$

Alternative formula for finding electrochemical equivalent is as follows:

$$Z=E/F$$

where $E$ is the Equivalent weight of the substance and $F$ is Faraday constant.

== Experimental analysis of electrochemical equivalent ==
For example, to determine the ECE of copper, a copper voltameter is often used. In this device, a vessel which consist of copper sulfate solution and in which two electrodes of copper are dipped. The middle plate is cathode and other outer plates are used as anode, this allows a deposit of copper to accumulate into the faces of copper cathode plates. The voltameter is connected in series with the battery, an ammeter, rheostat and switch. The cathode is first dried and weighed precisely. The current is switched on and measured as soon as possible and with a limited value of charge density (usually 1 A for every 50 m^{2}). This is because if charge density is too much, the deposit may not stick with cathode and will wash off.

== Eq values of some elements in kg/C ==
Element	Electrochemical equivalent
Silver (Ag)	1.118×10^(-6) 0.00118gm/c
Copper (Cu)	3.295×10^(-7)
Gold (Au)	6.812×10^(-7)
Iron (Fe)	2.894×10^(-7)
Zinc (Zn)	3.389×10^(-7)
Hydrogen (H2)	1.04472×10^(-8)
Sodium (Na)	2.387×10^(-7)
Potassium (K)	4.055×10^(-7)
Oxygen (O2)	8.28×10^(-8)
Aluminum (Al)	9.36×10^(-8)
