= Deposition (chemistry) =

Chemical process

In chemistry, deposition occurs when molecules settle out of a solution.

Deposition can be viewed as a reverse process to dissolution or particle re-entrainment.

=== Types ===
- Physical Vapor Deposition: The method by which the material to be deposited is vaporized from a solid, transferred to a substrate surface and allowed to condense on it.
- Thermal evaporation: The material is vaporized using electric beam and transported in high vacuum(10^-6 torr) to the substrate on which it condenses. It is typically used in pure metals and oxides.
- Sputtering: the target material is moved to a substrate using plasma and high-energy ions, typically involving Argon. Reactive sputtering may be used to deposit nitrides. There are further different types, such as DC, RF and magnetron.
- Atomic Layer deposition: Precursors react on the substrate to form a thin film layer by layer. Precursors are alternated into the process chambers. Examples such as hic, super capacitor, and batteries.
- Chemical Vapor Deposition (CVD): the material to be deposited is produced using a chemical reaction which may be transferred to a substrate by adsorption and by-products are desorbed and removed.

==== Types of CVD ====
- Low pressure CVD: Pressures ranging from 0.1 to 10 torr, and wide temperature range of 200 to 800°C. Precursors are delivered through specialized systems for uniformity. By products are gaseous and removed using pumps.
- Metal Organic CVD: typically used for deposit class of III - V Nitrides and in Low temperatures.
- Epitaxy: the thin film is templated on the substrate, low stacking faults, examples include Silicon and Silicon-Germanium compounds.
- Plasma enhanced CVD: plasma provides the energy to complete the reaction and reduce the process temperature. It is typically used for oxides.

== See also ==
- Atomic layer deposition
- Chemical vapor deposition
- Deposition (physics)
- Fouling
- Physical vapor deposition
- Thin-film deposition
- Fused filament fabrication
- Precipitation (chemistry)
