= John Frederic Daniell =

English chemist and physicist (1790–1845)

John Frederic Daniell FRS
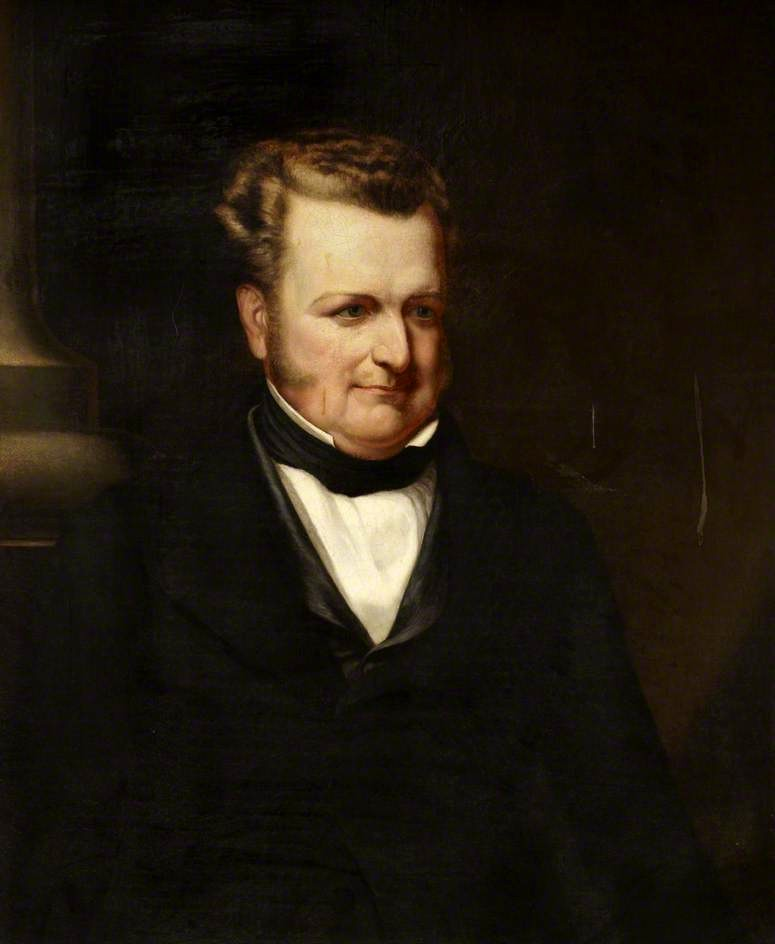
- Born: 12 March 1790; London, England
- Died: 13 March 1845 (aged 55); London, England
- Education: University of Oxford (Doctor of Civil Law, 1842)
- Awards: Rumford Medal (1832); Copley Medal (1837); Royal Medal (1842)
- Scientific career
- Fields: Chemistry; Physics
- Workplaces: King's College London

John Frederic Daniell FRS (12 March 1790 – 13 March 1845) was an English chemist and physicist.

== Biography ==
Daniell was born in London. In 1831, he became the first professor of chemistry at the newly founded King's College London; and in 1835, he was appointed to the equivalent post at the East India Company's Military Seminary at Addiscombe, Surrey. His name is best known for his invention of the Daniell cell, an element of an electric battery much better than voltaic cells. He also invented the dew-point hygrometer known by his name, and a register pyrometer; and in 1830, he erected in the hall of the Royal Society a water-barometer, with which he carried out a large number of observations. A process devised by him for the manufacture of illuminating gas from turpentine and resin was in use in New York City for a time.

In 1842, he was awarded an honorary Doctorate of Civil Law by the University of Oxford.

== Publications ==
Daniell's publications included Meteorological Essays (1823), an Essay on Artificial Climate considered in its Applications to Horticulture (1824), which showed the necessity of a humid atmosphere in hothouses devoted to tropical plants, and an Introduction to the Study of Chemical Philosophy (1839).

== Lectures ==
In 1840, he was invited to deliver the Royal Institution Christmas Lecture on The First Principles of Franklinic Electricity.

== Death and commemoration ==
Daniell died suddenly of apoplexy in London in March 1845, while attending a meeting of the council of the Royal Society, of which he had become a fellow in 1813 and Foreign Secretary in 1839.

The lunar crater Daniell is named after him.

== See also ==
- Timeline of hydrogen technologies

== Bibliography ==
- Stephen, Leslie, ed. (1888). "Daniell, John Frederic" . Dictionary of National Biography. Vol. 14. London: Smith, Elder & Co. p. 33.
