= Faraday's laws of electrolysis =

Physical laws of electrochemistry

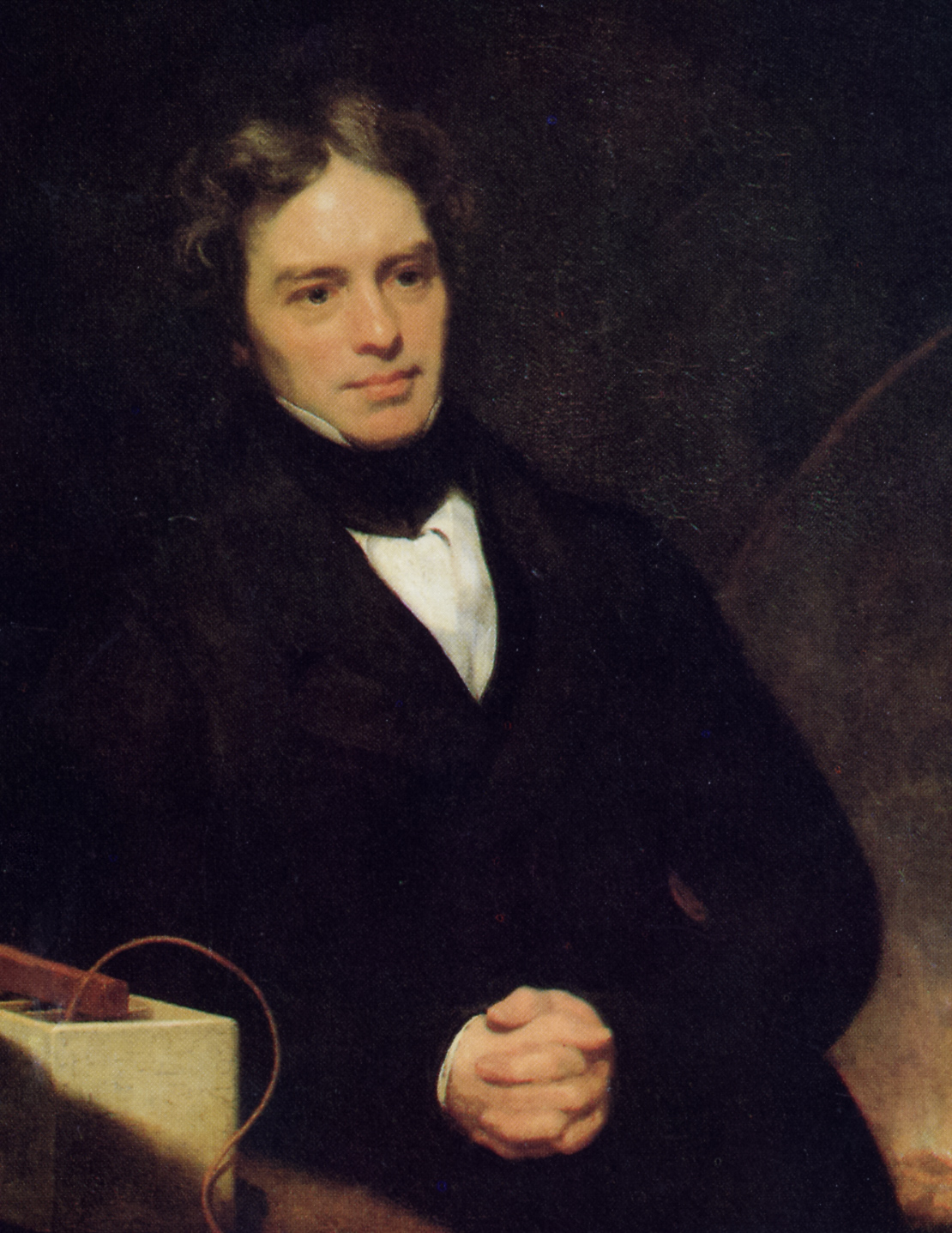
Michael Faraday

Faraday's laws of electrolysis are quantitative relationships based on the electrochemical research published by Michael Faraday in 1833.

== First law ==
Michael Faraday reported that the mass (m) of a substance deposited or liberated at an electrode during electrolysis is directly proportional to the charge (Q, for which the SI unit is the ampere-second or coulomb). passed through the electrolyte.
$$m  \propto Q \quad \implies \quad \frac{m}{Q} = Z$$

Here, the constant of proportionality, Z, is called the electro-chemical equivalent (ECE) of the substance. Thus, the ECE can be defined as the mass of the substance deposited or liberated per unit charge.

== Second law ==
Faraday discovered that when the same amount of electric current is passed through different electrolytes connected in series, the masses of the substances deposited or liberated at the electrodes are directly proportional to their respective chemical equivalent/equivalent weight (E). This turns out to be the molar mass (M) divided by the valence (v)

$$\begin{align}
& m \propto E; \quad E = \frac{\text{molar mass}}{\text{valence}} = \frac{M}{v} \\
& \implies m_1 : m_2 : m_3 :  \ldots = E_1 : E_2 : E_3 : \ldots \\
& \implies Z_1 Q : Z_2 Q : Z_3 Q : \ldots = E_1 : E_2 : E_3 : \ldots \\
& \implies Z_1 : Z_2 : Z_3 : \ldots = E_1 : E_2 : E_3 : \ldots
\end{align}$$

The modern form of the second law is
$$F = Ne$$
where F is the Faraday constant, N is Avogadro's number and e is the elementary charge. This form requires an understanding of chemical valence unavailable in Faraday's time.

== Mathematical form ==
Faraday's laws can be summarized by

$$Z = \frac{m}{Q}  = \frac{1}{F}\left(\frac{M}{v}\right) = \frac{E}{F}$$

where M is the molar mass of the substance (usually given in SI units of grams per mole) and v is the valency of the ions .

For Faraday's first law, M, F, v are constants; thus, the larger the value of Q, the larger m will be.

For Faraday's second law, Q, F, v are constants; thus, the larger the value of $\tfrac{M}{v}$ (equivalent weight), the larger m will be.

In the simple case of constant-current electrolysis, Q = It, leading to

$$m  =\frac{ItM}{Fv}$$

and then to

$$n  =\frac{It}{Fv}$$

where:

- n is the amount of substance ("number of moles") liberated: $n = \tfrac m M$
- t is the total time the constant current was applied.

For the case of an alloy whose constituents have different valencies, we have
$$m = \frac{It}{F \times \sum_{i} \frac{w_i v_i}{M_i}}$$
where w_{i} represents the mass fraction of the ith element.

In the more complicated case of a variable electric current, the total charge Q is the electric current I(τ) integrated over time τ:

$$Q = \int_0^t I(\tau) \, d\tau$$

Here t is the total electrolysis time.

== Applications ==
- Electroplating – a process where a thin layer of metal is deposited onto the surface of an object using an electric current
- Electrochemical cells – generates electrical energy from chemical reactions
- Electrotyping – a process used to create metal copies of designs by depositing metal onto a mold using electroplating
- Electrowinning – a process that extract metals from their solutions using an electric current
- Electroforming – a process that deposits metal onto a mold or substrate to create metal parts
- Anodization – a process that converts the surface of a metal into a durable corrosion-resistant oxide layer
- Conductive polymers – organic polymers that conduct electricity
- Water electrolysis – a process that uses an electric current to split water molecules into hydrogen and oxygen gases
- Electrolytic capacitors – a type of capacitor that uses an electrolytic solution as one of its plates

== See also ==
- Electrolysis
- Faraday's law of induction
- Tafel equation
