= Total ionic strength adjustment buffer =

Total ionic strength adjustment buffer (TISAB) is a buffer solution which increases the ionic strength of a solution to a relatively high level. This is important for potentiometric measurements, including ion selective electrodes, because they measure the activity of the analyte rather than its concentration. TISAB essentially masks minor changes made in the ionic strength of the solution and hence increases the accuracy of the reading.

== Theory ==
TISAB is very commonly applied to fluoride ion analysis such as in fluoride ion selective electrodes.

There are four main constituents to TISAB, namely CDTA (cyclohexylenedinitrilotetraacetate), sodium hydroxide, sodium chloride and acetic acid (ethanoic acid), which are all dissolved in deionised water. Hence, TISAB has a density ~1.0 kg/L, though this can vary to 1.18 kg/L. Each constituent plays an important role in controlling the ionic strength and pH of the analyte solution, which may otherwise cause error and inaccuracy.

The activity of a substance in solution depends on the product of its concentration and the activity coefficient in that solution. The activity coefficient depends on the ionic strength of the solution in which the potentiometric measurements are made. This can be calculated for dilute solutions using the Debye–Hückel equation; for more concentrated solutions other approximations must be used. In most cases, the analyst's goal is simply to make sure that the activity coefficient is constant across a set of solutions, with the assumption that no significant ion pairing exists in the solutions.

Example: An ion-selective electrode might be calibrated using dilute solutions of the analyte in distilled water. If this calibration is used to calculate the concentration of the analyte in sea water (high ionic strength), significant error is introduced by the difference between the activity of the analyte in the dilute solutions and the concentrated sample. This can be avoided by adding a small amount of ionic-strength buffer to the standards, so that the activity coefficients match more closely.

Adding a TISAB buffer to increase the ionic strength of the solution helps to "fix" the ionic strength at a stable level, making a linear correlation between the logarithm of the concentration of analyte and the measured voltage. By also adding the TISAB buffer to the samples from which the potentiometric equipment are calibrated, the linear correlation can be used to calculate the concentration of analyte in the solution.

$$E = K' + \frac{RT}{nF} \ln(c)$$

where $E$ is measured voltage, $R$ is the gas constant, $T$ the temperature measured in kelvins, $F$ is the Faraday constant and $n$ the charge of the analyte. $c$ is the concentration of analyte.

TISAB buffers often include chelators which bind ions that could otherwise interfere with the analyte.
