= Conductivity (electrolytic) =

Measure of the ability of a solution containing electrolytes to conduct electricity

Conductivity or specific conductance of an electrolyte solution is a measure of its ability to conduct electricity. The SI unit of conductivity is siemens per meter (S/m).

Conductivity measurements are used routinely in many industrial and environmental applications as a fast, inexpensive and reliable way of measuring the ionic content in a solution. For example, the measurement of product conductivity is a typical way to monitor and continuously trend the performance of water purification systems.

The electrolytic conductivity of ultra-high purity water increases as a function of temperature (T) due to the higher dissociation of H_{2}O in H^{+} and OH^{−} with T.

In many cases, conductivity is linked directly to the total dissolved solids (TDS).

High-quality deionized water has a conductivity of

$\kappa = 0.05501 \pm 0.0001$ μS/cm at 25 °C.

This corresponds to a specific resistivity of

$\rho = 18.18 \pm 0.03$ MΩ⋅cm.

The preparation of salt solutions often takes place in unsealed beakers. In this case the conductivity of purified water often is 10 to 20 times higher. A discussion can be found below.

Typical drinking water is in the range of 200–800 μS/cm, while sea water is about 50 mS/cm (or 0.05 S/cm).

Electrolytic conductivity varies from about 10E-10 S/m for purified toluene up to about 10 S/m for recently discovered highly concentrated “water-in-salt” solutions.

Conductivity of aqueous and other polar solutions is traditionally determined by connecting the electrolyte in a Wheatstone bridge. Dilute solutions follow Kohlrausch's law of concentration dependence and additivity of ionic contributions. Lars Onsager gave a theoretical explanation of Kohlrausch's law by extending Debye–Hückel theory.

Conductivity of low- and non-polar solutions is very low. It is also associated with motion of ions in electric field, but the nature and solvation of ions are different, as described on the page conductivity (non-aqueous). It is usually measured with probes having low cell constant and applying low frequency electric field.

Notation is treacherous in this domain. Rho ($\rho$) reliably denotes specific resistivity, usually quantified in units of ohm-meter. Kappa and sigma ($\kappa$ and $\sigma$) are inversely proportional to sigma, with kappa preferred in classical electrochemistry and sigma preferred in Maxwellian electrodynamics. Unfortunately, both kappa and sigma have prominent confounds that can trip up the unwary. In electrochemistry, kappa is also used to denote inverse Debye screening length. In electrodynamics, sigma is also used to denote double-layer charge density.

== Units ==
The SI unit of conductivity is S/m, and unless otherwise qualified, it refers to 25 °C. More generally encountered is the traditional unit of μS/cm.

The commonly used standard cell has a width of 1 cm, and thus for very pure water in equilibrium with air would have a resistance of about 10^{6} ohms, known as a megohm. Ultra-pure water could achieve 18 megohms or more. Thus in the past, megohm-cm was used, sometimes abbreviated to "megohm". Sometimes, conductivity is given in "microsiemens" (omitting the distance term in the unit). While this is an error, it can often be assumed to be equal to the traditional μS/cm. Often, by typographic limitations μS/cm is expressed as uS/cm.

The conversion of conductivity (in μS/cm) to the total dissolved solids (in mg/kg) depends on the chemical composition of the sample and can vary between 0.54 and 0.96. Typically, the conversion is done assuming that the solid is sodium chloride; 1 μS/cm is then equivalent to about 0.64 mg of NaCl per kg of water.

Molar conductivity has the SI unit S⋅m^{2}⋅mol^{−1}. Older publications use the unit Ω^{−1}⋅cm^{2}⋅mol^{−1}.

== Measurement ==
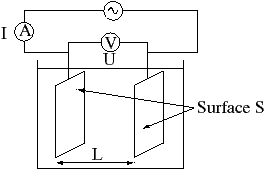
Principle of the measurement

The electrical conductivity of a solution of an electrolyte is measured by determining the resistance of the solution between two flat or cylindrical electrodes separated by a fixed distance. An alternating voltage is generally used in order to minimize water electrolysis. The resistance is measured by a conductivity meter. Typical frequencies used are in the range 1–3 kHz. The dependence on the frequency is usually small, but may become appreciable at very high frequencies, an effect known as the Debye–Falkenhagen effect.

A wide variety of instrumentation is commercially available. Most commonly, two types of electrode sensors are used: electrode-based sensors and inductive sensors. Electrode sensors with a static design are suitable for low and moderate conductivities and exist in various types, having either two or four electrodes, where electrodes can be arranged oppositely, flat or in a cylinder. Electrode cells with a flexible design, where the distance between two oppositely arranged electrodes can be varied, offer high accuracy and can also be used for the measurement of highly conductive media. Inductive sensors are suitable for harsh chemical conditions but require larger sample volumes than electrode sensors. Conductivity sensors are typically calibrated with KCl solutions of known conductivity. Electrolytic conductivity is highly temperature-dependent, but many commercial systems offer automatic temperature correction. Tables of reference conductivities are available for many common solutions.

== Definitions ==
Resistance R is proportional to the distance l between the electrodes and is inversely proportional to the cross-sectional area of the sample A (noted S on the figure above). Writing ρ (rho) for the specific resistance, or resistivity,

$$R = \rho \frac{l}{A}.$$

In practice the conductivity cell is calibrated by using solutions of known specific resistance ρ*, so the individual quantities l and A need not be known precisely, but only their ratio. If the resistance of the calibration solution is R^{*}, a cell constant, defined as the ratio of l and A (C = l/A), is derived:

$$R^* = \rho^* \times C.$$

The specific conductance (conductivity) κ (kappa) is the reciprocal of the specific resistance:

$$\kappa = \frac{1}{\rho} = \frac{C}{R}.$$

Sometimes the conductance (reciprocical of the resistance) is denoted as G = 1/R. Then the specific conductance κ (kappa) is

$$\kappa = C \times G.$$

Conductivity is also temperature-dependent.

== Theory ==
The specific conductance of a solution containing one electrolyte depends on the concentration of the electrolyte. Therefore, it is convenient to divide the specific conductance by concentration. This quotient, termed molar conductivity, is denoted by Λ_{m}:

$$\Lambda_\text{m} =\frac{\kappa}{c}.$$

=== Strong electrolytes ===
Strong electrolytes are hypothesized to dissociate completely in solution. The conductivity of a solution of a strong electrolyte at low concentration follows Kohlrausch's Law:

$$\Lambda_\text{m} = \Lambda_\text{m}^0 - K \sqrt{c},$$

where Λ^{0}_{m} is known as the limiting molar conductivity, K is an empirical constant, and c is the electrolyte concentration. ("Limiting" here means "at the limit of the infinite dilution".) In effect, the observed conductivity of a strong electrolyte becomes directly proportional to concentration at sufficiently low concentrations, i.e. when

$$\Lambda_\text{m}^0 \gg K \sqrt{c}.$$

As the concentration is increased, however, the conductivity no longer rises in proportion. Moreover, Kohlrausch also found that the limiting conductivity of an electrolyte,

λ^{0}_{+} and λ^{0}_{−},

are the limiting molar conductivities of the individual ions.

The following table gives values for the limiting molar conductivities for some selected ions.

Table of limiting ion conductivity in water at 298 K (about 25 °C)
Cations	λ^{0}_{+} / mS m^{2} mol^{−1}	Cations	λ^{0}_{+} / mS m^{2} mol^{−1}	Anions	λ^{0}_{−} / mS m^{2} mol^{−1}	Anions	λ^{0}_{−} / mS m^{2} mol^{−1}
H^{+}	34.982	Ba^{2+}	12.728	OH^{−}	19.8	SO^{2−}_{4}	15.96
Li^{+}	3.869	Mg^{2+}	10.612	Cl^{−}	7.634	C_{2}O^{2−}_{4}	7.4
Na^{+}	5.011	La^{3+}	20.88	Br^{−}	7.84	HC_{2}O^{−}_{4}	4.306
K^{+}	7.352	Rb^{+}	7.64	I^{−}	7.68	HCOO^{−}	5.6
NH^{+}_{4}	7.34	Cs^{+}	7.68	NO^{−}_{3}	7.144	CO^{2−}_{3}	7.2
Ag^{+}	6.192	Be^{2+}	4.50	CH_{3}COO^{−}	4.09	HSO^{2−}_{3}	5.0
Ca^{2+}	11.90			ClO^{−}_{4}	6.80	SO^{2−}_{3}	7.2
Co(NH_{3})^{3+}_{6}	10.2			F^{−}	5.50		

An interpretation of these results was based on the theory of Debye and Hückel, yielding the Debye–Hückel–Onsager theory:

$$\Lambda_\text{m} = \Lambda_\text{m}^0 - (A + B\Lambda_\text{m}^0) \sqrt{c},$$

where A and B are constants that depend only on known quantities such as temperature, the charges on the ions and the dielectric constant and viscosity of the solvent. As the name suggests, this is an extension of the Debye–Hückel theory, due to Onsager. It is very successful for solutions at low concentration.

=== Weak electrolytes ===
A weak electrolyte is one that is never fully dissociated (there is a mixture of ions and neutral molecules in equilibrium). In this case there is no limit of dilution below which the relationship between conductivity and concentration becomes linear. Instead, the solution becomes ever more fully dissociated at weaker concentrations, and for low concentrations of "well behaved" weak electrolytes, the degree of dissociation of the weak electrolyte becomes proportional to the inverse square root of the concentration.

Typical weak electrolytes are weak acids and weak bases. The concentration of ions in a solution of a weak electrolyte is less than the concentration of the electrolyte itself. For acids and bases the concentrations can be calculated when the value or values of the acid dissociation constant are known.

For a monoprotic acid HA obeying the inverse square root law, with a dissociation constant K_{a}, an explicit expression for the conductivity as a function of concentration c, known as Ostwald's dilution law, can be obtained:

$$\frac{1}{\Lambda_\text{m}} = \frac{1}{\Lambda_\text{m}^0} + \frac{\Lambda_\text{m} c}{K_\text{a}{(\Lambda_\text{m}^0)}^2}.$$

Various solvents exhibit the same dissociation if the ratio of relative permittivities equals the ratio cubic roots of concentrations of the electrolytes (Walden's rule).

=== Higher concentrations ===
Both Kohlrausch's law and the Debye–Hückel–Onsager equation break down as the concentration of the electrolyte increases above a certain value. The reason for this is that as concentration increases the average distance between cation and anion decreases, so that there is more interactions between close ions. Whether this constitutes ion association is a moot point. However, it has often been assumed that cation and anion interact to form an ion pair. So an "ion-association" constant K can be derived for the association equilibrium between ions A^{+} and B^{−}:

A^{+} + B^{−} ⇌ A^{+}B^{−} with K = ([A^{+}B^{−}])/([A^{+}] [B^{−}]).

Davies describes the results of such calculations in great detail, but states that K should not necessarily be thought of as a true equilibrium constant, rather, the inclusion of an "ion-association" term is useful in extending the range of good agreement between theory and experimental conductivity data. Various attempts have been made to extend Onsager's treatment to more concentrated solutions.

The existence of a so-called conductance minimum in solvents having the relative permittivity under 60 has proved to be a controversial subject as regards interpretation. Fuoss and Kraus suggested that it is caused by the formation of ion triplets, and this suggestion has received some support recently.

Other developments on this topic have been done by Theodore Shedlovsky, E. Pitts, R. M. Fuoss, Fuoss and Shedlovsky, Fuoss and Onsager.

=== Non-polar liquids ===
Pioneering works Onsager, Fuoss, Kraus in 20th century proved that ionization in nonpolar liquids is possible and it leads to controllable electrolytic conductivity. Onsager created the first theory of this conductivity that takes into account formation of ion pairs predicted by Bjerrum. Ion pairs occur in non-polar liquid because of much stronger electrostatic attraction between cation and anion. This attraction brings them together, but they retain their solvation layer in such new entity called “ion pair”. Solvation layers of ions in non-polar liquids are formed by neutral molecules of amphiphile solute as described on the page Ion. Formation of ion-pairs leads to electrolytic conductivity reduction, which was taken into account by Onsager theory.

=== Mixed solvents systems ===
The limiting equivalent conductivity of solutions based on mixed solvents like water alcohol has minima depending on the nature of alcohol. For methanol the minimum is at 15 molar % water, and for the ethanol at 6 molar % water.

=== Conductivity versus temperature ===
Generally the conductivity of a solution increases with temperature, as the mobility of the ions increases. For comparison purposes reference values are reported at an agreed temperature, usually 298 K (≈ 25 °C or 77 °F), although occasionally 20 °C (68 °F) is used. So-called "compensated" measurements are made at a convenient temperature but the value reported is a calculated value of the expected value of conductivity of the solution, as if it had been measured at the reference temperature. Basic compensation is normally done by assuming a linear increase of conductivity versus temperature of typically 2% per kelvin. This value is broadly applicable for most salts at room temperature. Determination of the precise temperature coefficient for a specific solution is simple, and instruments are typically capable of applying the derived coefficient (i.e. other than 2%).

Measurements of conductivity $\sigma$ versus temperature can be used to determine the activation energy $E_\text{A}$, using the Arrhenius equation

$$\sigma = \sigma_0 e^{-E_\text{A}/RT},$$

where $\sigma_0$ is the exponential prefactor, R the gas constant, and T the absolute temperature in kelvins.

=== Solvent isotopic effect ===
The change in conductivity due to the isotope effect for deuterated electrolytes is sizable.

=== Mixtures ===
The Maxwell mixture model predicts a mixture’s effective conductivity from the conductivities and volume fractions of its components. In the case of blood, where the inclusions are not spherical, a somewhat different relationship has been established: the Maxwell–Fricke equation.

== Applications ==
Despite the difficulty of theoretical interpretation, measured conductivity is a good indicator of the presence or absence of conductive ions in solution, and measurements are used extensively in many industries. For example, conductivity measurements are used to monitor quality in public water supplies, in hospitals, in boiler water and industries that depend on water quality such as brewing. This type of measurement is not ion-specific; it can sometimes be used to determine the amount of total dissolved solids (TDS) if the composition of the solution and its conductivity behavior are known. Conductivity measurements made to determine water purity will not respond to non conductive contaminants (many organic compounds fall into this category), therefore additional purity tests may be required depending on application.

Applications of TDS measurements are not limited to industrial use; many people use TDS as an indicator of the purity of their drinking water. Additionally, aquarium enthusiasts are concerned with TDS, both for freshwater and salt water aquariums. Many fish and invertebrates require quite narrow parameters for dissolved solids. Especially for successful breeding of some invertebrates normally kept in freshwater aquariums—snails and shrimp primarily—brackish water with higher TDS, specifically higher salinity, water is required. While the adults of a given species may thrive in freshwater, this is not always true for the young and some species will not breed at all in non-brackish water.

Sometimes, conductivity measurements are linked with other methods to increase the sensitivity of detection of specific types of ions. For example, in the boiler water technology, the boiler blowdown is continuously monitored for "cation conductivity", which is the conductivity of the water after it has been passed through a cation exchange resin. This is a sensitive method of monitoring anion impurities in the boiler water in the presence of excess cations (those of the alkalizing agent usually used for water treatment). The sensitivity of this method relies on the high mobility of H^{+} in comparison with the mobility of other cations or anions. Beyond cation conductivity, there are analytical instruments designed to measure Degas conductivity, where conductivity is measured after dissolved carbon dioxide has been removed from the sample, either through reboiling or dynamic degassing.

Conductivity detectors are commonly used with ion chromatography.

== Conductivity of purified water in electrochemical experiments ==
The electronic conductivity of purified distilled water in electrochemical laboratory settings at room temperature is often between 0.05 and 1 μS/cm. Environmental influences during the preparation of salt solutions as gas absorption due to storing the water in an unsealed beaker may immediately increase the conductivity from 0.055 μS/cm and lead to values between 0.5 and 1 μS/cm.

When distilled water is heated during the preparation of salt solutions, the conductivity increases even without adding salt. This is often not taken into account.

Temperature dependence of the electronic conductivity of purified distilled water. The gray area indicates the margin of error in the measurements. Data on GitHub.

In a typical experiment under the fume hood in an unsealed beaker the conductivity of purified water increases typically nonlinearly from values below 1 μS/cm to values close 3.5 μS/cm at 95 °C. This temperature dependence has to be taken into account particularly in dilute salt solutions.

== See also ==
- Einstein relation (kinetic theory)
- Born equation
- Debye–Falkenhagen effect
- Law of dilution
- Ion transport number
- Ionic atmosphere
- Wien effect
- Conductimetric titration - methods to determine the equivalence point
