= Law of dilution =

Law of Ostwald for dissociation of electrolytes

Wilhelm Ostwald’s dilution law is a relationship proposed in 1888 between the dissociation constant K_{d} and the degree of dissociation α of a weak electrolyte. The law takes the form

$$K_d = \cfrac{\ce{[A+] [B^{-}]}}{\ce{[AB]}} = \frac{\alpha^2}{1-\alpha} \cdot c_0$$

Where the square brackets denote concentration, and c_{0} is the total concentration of electrolyte.

Using $\alpha=\Lambda_c/\Lambda_0$, where $\Lambda_c$ is the molar conductivity at concentration c and $\Lambda_0$ is the limiting value of molar conductivity extrapolated to zero concentration or infinite dilution, this results in the following relation:

$$K_d = \cfrac{\Lambda_c^2}{(\Lambda_0 - \Lambda_c)\Lambda_0} \cdot c_0$$

== Derivation ==
Consider a binary electrolyte AB which dissociates reversibly into A^{+} and B^{−} ions. Ostwald noted that the law of mass action can be applied to such systems as dissociating electrolytes. The equilibrium state is represented by the equation:

$$\ce{AB <=> {A+} + B^-}$$

If α is the fraction of dissociated electrolyte, then αc_{0} is the concentration of each ionic species. (1 - α) must, therefore be the fraction of undissociated electrolyte, and (1 - α)c_{0} the concentration of same. The dissociation constant may therefore be given as

$$K_d = \cfrac{\ce{[A+ ] [B^- ]}}{\ce{[AB]}} = \cfrac{(\alpha c_0 )(\alpha c_0 )}{(1-\alpha) c_0 } = \cfrac{\alpha^2}{1-\alpha} \cdot c_0$$

For very weak electrolytes $\alpha \ll 1$, implying that (1 - α) ≈ 1.

$$K_d = \frac{\alpha^2}{1-\alpha} \cdot c_0 \approx \alpha^2 c_0$$

This gives the following results;

$$\alpha = \sqrt{\cfrac{K_d }{c_0 }}$$

Thus, the degree of dissociation of a weak electrolyte is proportional to the inverse square root of the concentration, or the square root of the dilution. The concentration of any one ionic species is given by the root of the product of the dissociation constant and the concentration of the electrolyte.

$$\ce{[A+ ]} = \ce{[B^- ]} = \alpha c_0 = \sqrt{K_d c_0 }$$

== Limitations ==
The Ostwald law of dilution provides a satisfactory description of the concentration dependence of the conductivity of weak electrolytes like CH_{3}COOH and NH_{4}OH. The variation of molar conductivity is essentially due to the incomplete dissociation of weak electrolytes into ions.

For strong electrolytes, however, Lewis and Randall recognized that the law fails badly since the supposed equilibrium constant is actually far from constant. This is because the dissociation of strong electrolytes into ions is essentially complete below a concentration threshold value. The decrease in molar conductivity as a function of concentration is actually due to attraction between ions of opposite charge as expressed in the Debye-Hückel-Onsager equation and later revisions.

Even for weak electrolytes the equation is not exact. Chemical thermodynamics shows that the true equilibrium constant is a ratio of thermodynamic activities, and that each concentration must be multiplied by an activity coefficient. This correction is important for ionic solutions due to the strong forces between ionic charges. An estimate of their values is given by the Debye–Hückel theory at low concentrations.

== See also ==
- Autosolvolysis
- Osmotic coefficient
- Activity coefficient
- Ion transport number
- Ion association
- Molar conductivity
