= Pitzer equations =

Thermodynamic extension of Debye–Hückel theory

Pitzer equations are important for the understanding of the behaviour of ions dissolved in natural waters such as rivers, lakes and sea-water. They were first described by physical chemist Kenneth Pitzer. The parameters of the Pitzer equations are linear combinations of parameters, of a virial expansion of the excess Gibbs free energy, which characterise interactions amongst ions and solvent. The derivation is thermodynamically rigorous at a given level of expansion. The parameters may be derived from various experimental data such as the osmotic coefficient, mixed ion activity coefficients, and salt solubility. They can be used to calculate mixed ion activity coefficients and water activities in solutions of high ionic strength for which the Debye–Hückel theory is no longer adequate. They are more rigorous than the equations of specific ion interaction theory (SIT theory), but Pitzer parameters are more difficult to determine experimentally than SIT parameters.

== Historical development ==
A starting point for the development can be taken as the virial equation of state for a gas.

$$PV= R T + B P + C P^2 + D P^3 \dots$$

where $P$ is the pressure, $V$ is the volume, $T$ is the temperature and $B, C, D$ ... are known as virial coefficients. The first term on the right-hand side is for an ideal gas. The remaining terms quantify the departure from the ideal gas law with changing pressure, $P$. It can be shown by statistical mechanics that the second virial coefficient arises from the intermolecular forces between pairs of molecules, the third virial coefficient involves interactions between three molecules, etc. This theory was developed by McMillan and Mayer.

Solutions of uncharged molecules can be treated by a modification of the McMillan-Mayer theory. However, when a solution contains electrolytes, electrostatic interactions must also be taken into account. The Debye–Hückel theory was based on the assumption that each ion was surrounded by a spherical "cloud" or ionic atmosphere made up of ions of the opposite charge. Expressions were derived for the variation of single-ion activity coefficients as a function of ionic strength. This theory was very successful for dilute solutions of 1:1 electrolytes and, as discussed below, the Debye–Hückel expressions are still valid at sufficiently low concentrations. The values calculated with Debye–Hückel theory diverge more and more from observed values as the concentrations and/or ionic charges increases. Moreover, Debye–Hückel theory takes no account of the specific properties of ions such as size or shape.

Brønsted had independently proposed an empirical equation,

$$\ln{\gamma} = - \alpha m^{1/2} - 2 \beta m$$
$$1-\varphi = (\alpha/3) m^{1/2} + \beta m$$

in which the activity coefficient depended not only on ionic strength, but also on the concentration, m, of the specific ion through the parameter β. This is the basis of SIT theory. It was further developed by Guggenheim. Scatchard extended the theory to allow the interaction coefficients to vary with ionic strength. Note that the second form of Brønsted's equation is an expression for the osmotic coefficient. Measurement of osmotic coefficients provides one means for determining mean activity coefficients.

== The Pitzer parameters ==
The exposition begins with a virial expansion of the excess Gibbs free energy

$$\frac{G^{ex}}{W_wRT} = f(I) +\sum_i \sum_j b_ib_j\lambda_{ij}(I)+\sum_i \sum_j \sum_kb_ib_jb_k\mu_{ijk}+\cdots$$

W_{w} is the mass of the water in kilograms, b_{i}, b_{j} ... are the molalities of the ions and $I = \tfrac{1}{2} \sum_i b_i {z_i}^2$ is the molal ionic strength. The first term, f(I) represents a Debye–Hückel extended law (see below). The quantities λ_{ij}(I) represent the short-range interactions in the presence of solvent between solute particles i and j. This binary interaction parameter or second virial coefficient depends on ionic strength, on the particular species i and j and the temperature and pressure. The quantities μ_{ijk} represent the interactions between three particles. Higher terms may also be included in the virial expansion.

Next, the free energy is expressed as the sum of chemical potentials, or partial molal free energy,

$$G= \sum_i \mu_i\cdot N_i = \sum_i \left (\mu^0_i +RT \ln b_i\gamma_i \right )\cdot N_i$$

and an expression for the activity coefficient is obtained by differentiating the virial expansion with respect to a molality b.

$$\ln \gamma_i = \frac{\partial(\frac{G^{ex}}{W_wRT})}{\partial b_i}
=\frac{z_i^2}{2}f' +2\sum_j \lambda_{ij}b_j +\frac{z_i^2}{2}\sum_j\sum_k \lambda'_{jk} b_jb_k
+ 3\sum_j\sum_k \mu_{ijk} b_jb_k+ \cdots$$

And molal osmotic coefficient:

$$\phi-1=\left(\sum_ib_i\right)^{-1}\left[If'-f + \sum_i\sum_j\left(\lambda_{ij}+I\lambda'_{ij} \right)b_ib_j
+2\sum_i\sum_j\sum_k \mu_{ijk} b_ib_jb_k + \cdots\right]$$

However, these forms are not used directly, because it is not possible to determine the coefficients independently due to charge neutrality constraints.

Instead the sums are re-worked in terms of observable (charge-neutral) combinations and some choices are made about their functional forms, which we will see below:

- The $\lambda_{ij}$-related terms for salt pairs are gathered together into observable combinations ($B_{ca}$ values) and then a specific exponential functional form is imposed on them in terms of $\beta$ parameters, see below.
- The $\mu_{ijk}$-related terms for salt pairs are likewise gathered into observable combinations ($C_{ca}$ values).
- All ternary interactions $\mu_{ijk}$ involving three ions of same sign are set to 0.
- For mixed electrolytes, new combinations appear: $\Phi_{cc'}$, $\Phi_{aa'}$, and ternary interactions $\psi_{cc'a}$, $\psi_{caa'}$. A special functional form is applied to $\Phi$ in cases of unsymmetrical mixing (two ions present with same sign of charge but different magnitude).
- For electrolytes combined with neutral solutes, $\lambda_{ij}$ remain as-is, but they are assumed to be independent of ionic strength.

These observable combinations then provide a set of free parameters which are then empirically fit to experimental data.

=== Pure electrolyte case ===
Consider a simple electrolyte M_{p}X_{q} with molal concentration m, dissolved to ions M^{z^{+}} and X^{z^{−}}, with ionic molal concentrations $b_M = pm$ and $b_X = qm$.

The Pitzer parameters $f^\phi$, $B^\phi_{MX}$ and $C^\phi_{MX}$ are defined as

$$f^\phi=\frac{f'-\frac{f}{I}}{2}$$
$$B^\phi_{MX}=\lambda_{MX}+I\lambda'_{MX}
+\left(\frac{p}{2q}\right)\left(\lambda_{MM}+I\lambda'_{MM}\right)+\left(\frac{q}{2p}\right)\left(\lambda_{XX}+I\lambda'_{XX}\right)$$
$$C^\phi_{MX} =\left[\frac{3}{\sqrt{pq}}\right]
\left(p\mu_{MMX}+q\mu_{MXX}\right).$$

(Terms involving $\mu_{MMM}$ and $\mu_{XXX}$ are not included as interactions between three ions of the same charge are unlikely to occur except in very concentrated solutions.)

With these definitions, the expression for the (molal-basis) osmotic coefficient becomes

$$\phi-1=|z^+z^-|f^\phi+m\left(\frac{2pq}{p+q}\right)B^\phi_{MX}
+m^2\left[2\frac{(pq)^{3/2}}{p+q}\right]C^\phi_{MX}.$$

A similar expression is obtained for the (molal-basis) mean activity coefficient:

$$\ln \gamma_\pm =|z^+z^-|f^\gamma+m\left(\frac{2pq}{p+q}\right)B^\gamma_{MX}
+m^2\left[2\frac{(pq)^{3/2}}{p+q}\right]C^\gamma_{MX},$$

where $f^\gamma$, $B^\gamma_{MX}$ and $C^\gamma_{MX}$ are related to $f^\phi$, $B^\phi_{MX}$ and $C^\phi_{MX}$, but distinct.

Finally, some forms are imposed on the coefficients based on a mixture of theoretical and empirical observations:

- The term f^{φ} is defined to be an extended Debye–Hückel term:
  $$f^\phi = -A_\phi \frac{I^{1/2}}{1 + b I^{1/2}}$$
  with $A_{\phi}$ being calculated in terms of the solvent dielectric constant, and $b=1.2~\mathrm{kg}^{1/2}\mathrm{mol}^{-1/2}$ is defined as a universal empirical parameter (note this $b$ should not be confused with the molality $b_i$).
- The B parameter was found empirically to show an ionic strength dependence which could be expressed as
  $$B^\phi_{MX}=\beta^{(0)}_{MX} + \beta^{(1)}_{MX} e^{-\alpha \sqrt I},$$
  or sometimes with a second term which can often capture ion pairing effects without requiring explicit ion association accounting:
  $$B^\phi_{MX}=\beta^{(0)}_{MX} + \beta^{(1)}_{MX} e^{-\alpha_1 \sqrt I} + \beta^{(2)}_{MX} e^{-\alpha_2 \sqrt I}.$$
  (with specific values of $\alpha_1$ and $\alpha_2$ being chosen depending on the ion charges). The empirical Pitzer data tables therefore list $\beta^{(0)}_{MX}$, $\beta^{(1)}_{MX}$, and sometimes $\beta^{(2)}_{MX}$ (usually 0), whereas $C^\phi_{MX}$ is directly tabulated.

Note on ion association: If ion pairing is included as an ion association equilibrium with an explicit separate solute species (with its own separately-accounted concentration), then the empirical values $\beta^{(n)}$ and $C^\phi$ will change completely. Moreover, this choice fundamentally redefines the meaning and numerical values of ionic molalities, ionic strength, mean activity coefficients, and even the osmotic coefficient. Ionic mean activities and solvent activity are, however, thermodynamically independent of this accounting choice.

=== General case: mixed electrolytes, neutral solutes, and single-ion activities ===
Pitzer defines the above pure electrolyte case (yielding osmotic coefficient and mean activity) to be mathematically simple, then 'works backwards' to deduce the general case in a way that is consistent with the pure electrolyte case. Pitzer thus arrives at the following Gibbs energy:

$$\begin{aligned}
\frac{G^{ex}}{W_w RT} &= f(I) \\
&\quad + 2 \sum_{c} \sum_{a} b_c b_a \left[ B_{ca} + \left( \sum_{c} b_c z_c \right) C_{ca} \right] \\
&\quad + \mathop{\sum\sum}_{c < c'} b_c b_{c'} \left[ 2\Phi_{cc'} + \sum_{a} b_a \psi_{cc'a} \right] \\
&\quad + \mathop{\sum\sum}_{a < a'} b_a b_{a'} \left[ 2\Phi_{aa'} + \sum_{c} b_c \psi_{caa'} \right] \\
&\quad + 2 \sum_{n} \sum_{c} b_n b_c \lambda_{nc} + 2 \sum_{n} \sum_{a} b_n b_a \lambda_{na} \\
&\quad + 2 \mathop{\sum\sum}_{n < n'} b_n b_{n'} \lambda_{nn'} + \sum_{n} {b_n}^2 \lambda_{nn} + \dots.
\end{aligned}$$

where $c$ indices are positive ions (cations), $a$ are negative ions (anions), and $n$ are neutral solutes. Note that $B_{ca}$, $\Phi_{cc'}$, $\Phi_{aa'}$ are also functions of ionic strength.

This form (with the $\dots$ truncated) is then the actual master thermodynamic equation underlying Pitzer theory, and by differentiation it yields all other observable quantities (activity coefficients, osmotic coefficients).

This expression omits various terms proportional to the total charge $\sum_{i} z_i b_i$, and therefore it yields different single-ion activities compared to the original $G^{ex}$, but only in an unobservable way. The raw Pitzer single-ion activities are not experimentally observable on their own, and in practice they are combined into observables (like the mean activity above), or they are at least transformed to obey well-known activity conventions (such as the MacInnes convention).

The various terms are all consistent with the pure electrolyte case. For example, the full Debye-Huckel term is chosen to be
$$f(I) = -(4 I A_{\phi}/b)\ln(1 + b I^{1/2})$$
which is consistent with the $f^\phi$ above.

Expressions for the interaction coefficients $B_{ca}$, $C_{ca}$, $\Phi$, and $\psi$ can be found in standard references. It is crucial to note that the parameters appearing in the Gibbs energy differ from the tabulated parameters often labeled with $\phi$ or $\gamma$ superscripts. For example, $B_{ca}$ is the fundamental interaction parameter, while $B_{ca}^\phi$ and $B_{ca}^\gamma$ are derivatives used for osmotic and activity coefficient calculations respectively.

== Commentary ==
These equations were applied to an extensive range of experimental data at 25 °C with excellent agreement to about 6 mol kg^{−1} for various types of electrolyte. The treatment can be extended to mixed electrolytes and to include association equilibria. Values for the parameters β^{(0)}, β^{(1)} and C for inorganic and organic acids, bases and salts have been tabulated. Temperature and pressure variation is also discussed.

One area of application of Pitzer parameters is to describe the ionic strength variation of equilibrium constants measured as concentration quotients. Both SIT and Pitzer parameters have been used in this context, For example, both sets of parameters were calculated for some uranium complexes and were found to account equally well for the ionic strength dependence of the stability constants.

Pitzer parameters and SIT theory have been extensively compared. There are more parameters in the Pitzer equations than in the SIT equations. Because of this the Pitzer equations provide for more precise modelling of mean activity coefficient data and equilibrium constants. However, the determination of the greater number of Pitzer parameters means that they are more difficult to determine.

== Compilation of Pitzer parameters ==
Besides the set of parameters obtained by Pitzer et al. in the 1970s mentioned in the previous section. Kim and Frederick published the Pitzer parameters for 304 single salts in aqueous solutions at 298.15 K, extended the model to the concentration range up to the saturation point. Those parameters are widely used, however, many complex electrolytes including ones with organic anions or cations, which are very significant in some related fields, were not summarized in their paper.

For some complex electrolytes, Ge et al. obtained the new set of Pitzer parameters using up-to-date measured or critically reviewed osmotic coefficient or activity coefficient data.

== Comparable activity coefficient models ==
Besides the well-known Pitzer-like equations, there is a simple and easy-to-use semi-empirical model, which is called the three-characteristic-parameter correlation (TCPC) model. It was first proposed by Lin et al. It is a combination of the Pitzer long-range interaction and short-range solvation effect:

ln γ = ln γ^{PDH} + ln γ^{SV}

Ge et al. modified this model, and obtained the TCPC parameters for a larger number of single salt aqueous solutions. This model was also extended for a number of electrolytes dissolved in methanol, ethanol, 2-propanol, and so on. Temperature dependent parameters for a number of common single salts were also compiled, available at.

The performance of the TCPC model in correlation with the measured activity coefficient or osmotic coefficients is found to be comparable with Pitzer-like models.

Due to its empirical aspects, the Pitzer modelling framework has a number of well-known limitations. Most importantly, to improve the fits to experimental data, different variations of the equations have been described. Extrapolations, especially in the temperature and pressure domain, are generally problematic. One alternative modelling approach has been specifically designed to address this extrapolation issue by reducing the number of equation parameters while maintaining similar predictive precision and accuracy.

== See also ==
- Bromley equation
- Davies equation
- Osmotic coefficient
