= Osmotic coefficient =

Quantity characterizing the deviation of a solvent from ideal behavior

An osmotic coefficient $\phi$ is a quantity which characterises the deviation of a solvent from ideal behaviour, referenced to Raoult's law. It can be also applied to solutes. Its definition depends on the ways of expressing chemical composition of mixtures.

The osmotic coefficient based on molality b is defined by:
$$\phi = \frac{\mu_A^* - \mu_A}{RTM_A \sum_i b_i}$$

and on a mole fraction basis by:

$$\phi = -\frac{\mu_A^* - \mu_A}{RT \ln x_A}$$

where $\mu_A^*$ is the chemical potential of the pure solvent and $\mu_A$ is the chemical potential of the solvent in a solution, M_{A} is its molar mass, x_{A} its mole fraction, R the gas constant and T the temperature in Kelvin. The latter osmotic coefficient is sometimes called the rational osmotic coefficient. The values for the two definitions are different, but since

$$\ln x_A = - \ln \left(1 + M_A \sum_i b_i \right) \approx - M_A \sum_i b_i,$$

the two definitions are similar, and in fact both approach 1 as the concentration goes to zero.

== Applications ==
For liquid solutions, the osmotic coefficient is often used to calculate the salt activity coefficient from the solvent activity, or vice versa. For example, freezing point depression measurements, or measurements of deviations from ideality for other colligative properties, allows calculation of the salt activity coefficient through the osmotic coefficient.

== Relation to other quantities ==
In a single solute solution, the (molality based) osmotic coefficient and the solute activity coefficient $\gamma$ are related to the excess Gibbs free energy $G^E$ by the relations:

$$RTb
(1-\phi) = G^E - b \frac{dG^E}{db}$$
$$RT\ln\gamma = \frac{dG^E}{db}$$

and there is thus a differential relationship between them (temperature and pressure held constant):

$$d((\phi -1)b) = b d (\ln\gamma)$$

=== Liquid electrolyte solutions ===
For a single salt solute with molal activity ($\gamma_\pm b$), the osmotic coefficient can be written as $\phi=\frac{-\ln(a_A)}{\nu b M_A}$where $\nu$ is the stochiometric number of salt and $a_A$ the activity of the solvent. $\phi$ can be calculated from the salt activity coefficient via:

$$\phi = 1 + \frac{1}{b}\int_0^b bd \left( \ln (\gamma_{\pm}) \right)$$

Moreover, the activity coefficient of the salt $\gamma_{\pm}$ can be calculated from:

$$\ln (\gamma_{\pm}) = \phi-1+\int^b_0 \frac{\phi-1}{b} db$$

According to Debye–Hückel theory, which is accurate only at low concentrations, $(\phi - 1) \sum_i b_i$ is asymptotic to $-\frac 2 3 A I^{3/2}$, where I is ionic strength and A is the Debye–Hückel constant (equal to about 1.17 for water at 25 °C).

This means that, at least at low concentrations, the vapor pressure of the solvent will be greater than that predicted by Raoult's law. For instance, for solutions of magnesium chloride, the vapor pressure is slightly greater than that predicted by Raoult's law up to a concentration of 0.7 mol/kg, after which the vapor pressure is lower than Raoult's law predicts. For aqueous solutions, the osmotic coefficients can be calculated theoretically by Pitzer equations or TCPC model.

== See also ==
- Bromley equation
- Pitzer equation
- Davies equation
- van 't Hoff factor
- Law of dilution
- Thermodynamic activity
- Ion transport number
