= Hypostomus cordovae =

Scientific classification
- Kingdom: Animalia
- Phylum: Chordata
- Class: Actinopterygii
- Division: Teleostei
- Order: Siluriformes
- Family: Loricariidae
- Genus: Hypostomus
- Species: H. cordovae

Binomial name
- Hypostomus cordovae (Günther, 1880)

Synonyms
- Plecostomus cordovae

Species of fish

Hypostomus cordovae is a species of catfish in the family Loricariidae. It is native to South America, where it is known from Argentina. It occurs in areas with strong currents, well-oxygenated waters, and a substrate primarily composed of sandstone boulders, although patches of sand and pebbles are often present.

The water in which H. cordovae can be found typically has a temperature of 20.7 to 31.4 °C (69.3 to 88.5 °F), a turbidity of 1.29 to 75.1 NTU, a pH of 7.8 to 8.8, an oxygen concentration of 6.9 to 11.2 mg/L, and a conductivity of 4.530 to 77 μS/cm.

H. cordovae reaches 24.8 cm (9.8 inches) SL and is believed to be a facultative air-breather. Its specific epithet, cordovae, presumably refers to the province of Córdoba in Argentina.
