= Molar conductivity =

Conductivity per molar concentration of electrolyte

The molar conductivity of an electrolyte solution is defined as its conductivity divided by its molar concentration:

$$\Lambda_\text{m} = \frac{\kappa}{c},$$

where

κ is the measured conductivity (formerly known as specific conductance),
c is the molar concentration of the electrolyte.

The SI unit of molar conductivity is siemens metres squared per mole (S m^{2} mol^{−1}). However, values are often quoted in S cm^{2} mol^{−1}. In these last units, the value of Λ_{m} may be understood as the conductance of a volume of solution between parallel plate electrodes one centimeter apart and of sufficient area so that the solution contains exactly one mole of electrolyte.

== Variation of molar conductivity with dilution ==
There are two types of electrolytes: strong and weak. Strong electrolytes usually undergo complete ionization, and therefore they have higher conductivity than weak electrolytes, which undergo only partial ionization. For strong electrolytes, such as salts, strong acids and strong bases, the molar conductivity depends only weakly on concentration. On dilution there is a regular increase in the molar conductivity of strong electrolyte, due to the decrease in solute–solute interaction. Based on experimental data Friedrich Kohlrausch (around the year 1900) proposed the non-linear law for strong electrolytes:

$$\Lambda_\text{m} =\Lambda_\text{m}^\circ - K\sqrt{c} = \alpha f_\lambda \Lambda_\text{m}^\circ,$$

where

Λ^{∘}_{m} is the molar conductivity at infinite dilution (or limiting molar conductivity), which can be determined by extrapolation of Λ_{m} as a function of √c,
K is the Kohlrausch coefficient, which depends mainly on the stoichiometry of the specific salt in solution,
α is the dissociation degree even for strong concentrated electrolytes,
f_{λ} is the lambda factor for concentrated solutions.

This law is valid for low electrolyte concentrations only; it fits into the Debye–Hückel–Onsager equation.

For weak electrolytes (i.e. incompletely dissociated electrolytes), however, the molar conductivity strongly depends on concentration: The more dilute a solution, the greater its molar conductivity, due to increased ionic dissociation. For example, acetic acid has a higher molar conductivity in dilute aqueous acetic acid than in concentrated acetic acid.

== Kohlrausch's law of independent migration of ions ==
Friedrich Kohlrausch in 1875–1879 established that to a high accuracy in dilute solutions, molar conductivity can be decomposed into contributions of the individual ions. This is known as Kohlrausch's law of independent ionic migration. For any electrolyte A_{x}B_{y}, the limiting molar conductivity is expressed as x times the limiting molar conductivity of A^{y+} and y times the limiting molar conductivity of B^{x−}.

$$\Lambda_\text{m}^\circ = \sum_i \nu_i \lambda_i,$$

where:

λ_{i} is the limiting molar ionic conductivity of ion i,
ν_{i} is the number of ions i in the formula unit of the electrolyte (e.g. 2 and 1 for Na^{+} and SO^{2−}_{4} in Na_{2}SO_{4}).

Kohlrausch's evidence for this law was that the limiting molar conductivities of two electrolytes with two different cations and a common anion differ by an amount which is independent of the nature of the anion. For example, Λ_{0}(KX) − Λ_{0}(NaX) = 23.4 S cm^{2} mol^{−1} for X = Cl^{−}, I^{−} and 1/2 SO^{2−}_{4}. This difference is ascribed to a difference in ionic conductivities between K^{+} and Na^{+}. Similar regularities are found for two electrolytes with a common anion and two cations.

== Molar ionic conductivity ==
The molar ionic conductivity of each ionic species is proportional to its electrical mobility (μ), or drift velocity per unit electric field, according to the equation

$$\lambda = z \mu F,$$

where z is the ionic charge, and F is the Faraday constant.

The limiting molar conductivity of a weak electrolyte cannot be determined reliably by extrapolation. Instead it can be expressed as a sum of ionic contributions, which can be evaluated from the limiting molar conductivities of strong electrolytes containing the same ions. For aqueous acetic acid as an example,

$$\begin{aligned}
\Lambda_\text{m}^\circ(\ce{CH3COOH}) &= \lambda(\ce{CH3COO-}) + \lambda(\ce{H+}) \\
&= \Lambda_\text{m}^\circ(\ce{CH3COONa}) + \Lambda_\text{m}^\circ(\ce{HCl}) - \Lambda_\text{m}^\circ(\ce{NaCl}).
\end{aligned}$$

Values for each ion may be determined using measured ion transport numbers. For the cation:

$$\lambda^+ = t_+ \cdot \frac{\Lambda_0}{\nu^+},$$

and for the anion:

$$\lambda^- = t_- \cdot \frac{\Lambda_0}{\nu^-}.$$

Most monovalent ions in water have limiting molar ionic conductivities in the range of 40–80 S cm^{2} mol^{−1}. For example:

Cation	λ, S cm^{2} mol^{−1}
Li^{+}	38.6
Na^{+}	50.1
K^{+}	73.5
Ag^{+}	61.9

Anion	λ, S cm^{2} mol^{−1}
F^{−}	55.4
Cl^{−}	76.4
Br^{−}	78.1
CH_{3}COO^{−}	40.9

The order of the values for alkali metals is surprising, since it shows that the smallest cation Li^{+} moves more slowly in a given electric field than Na^{+}, which in turn moves more slowly than K^{+}. This occurs because of the effect of solvation of water molecules: the smaller Li^{+} binds most strongly to about four water molecules so that the moving cation species is effectively Li(H_{2}O)^{+}_{4}. The solvation is weaker for Na^{+} and still weaker for K^{+}. The increase in halogen ion mobility from F^{−} to Cl^{−} to Br^{−} is also due to decreasing solvation.

Exceptionally high values are found for H^{+} (349.8 S cm^{2} mol^{−1}) and OH^{−} (198.6 S cm^{2} mol^{−1}), which are explained by the Grotthuss proton-hopping mechanism for the movement of these ions. The H^{+} also has a larger conductivity than other ions in alcohols, which have a hydroxyl group, but behaves more normally in other solvents, including liquid ammonia and nitrobenzene.

For multivalent ions, it is usual to consider the conductivity divided by the equivalent ion concentration in terms of equivalents per litre, where 1 equivalent is the quantity of ions that have the same amount of electric charge as 1 mol of a monovalent ion: 1/2 mol Ca^{2+}, 1/2 mol SO^{2−}_{4}, 1/3 mol Al^{3+}, 1/4 mol Fe(CN)^{4−}_{6}, etc. This quotient can be called the equivalent conductivity, although IUPAC has recommended that use of this term be discontinued and the term molar conductivity be used for the values of conductivity divided by equivalent concentration. If this convention is used, then the values are in the same range as monovalent ions, e.g. 59.5 S cm^{2} mol^{−1} for 1/2 Ca^{2+} and 80.0 S cm^{2} mol^{−1} for 1/2 SO^{2−}_{4}.

From the ionic molar conductivities of cations and anions, effective ionic radii can be calculated using the concept of Stokes radius. The values obtained for an ionic radius in solution calculated this way can be quite different from the ionic radius for the same ion in crystals, due to the effect of hydration in solution.

== Applications ==
Ostwald's law of dilution, which gives the dissociation constant of a weak electrolyte as a function of concentration, can be written in terms of molar conductivity. Thus, the pK_{a} values of acids can be calculated by measuring the molar conductivity and extrapolating to zero concentration. Namely, pK_{a} = p(K/(1 mol/L)) at the zero-concentration limit, where K is the dissociation constant from Ostwald's law.
