= Bates–Guggenheim Convention =

In chemistry, the Bates–Guggenheim Convention refers to a conventional method based on the Debye–Hückel theory to determine pH standard values.
