= Ion interaction chromatography =

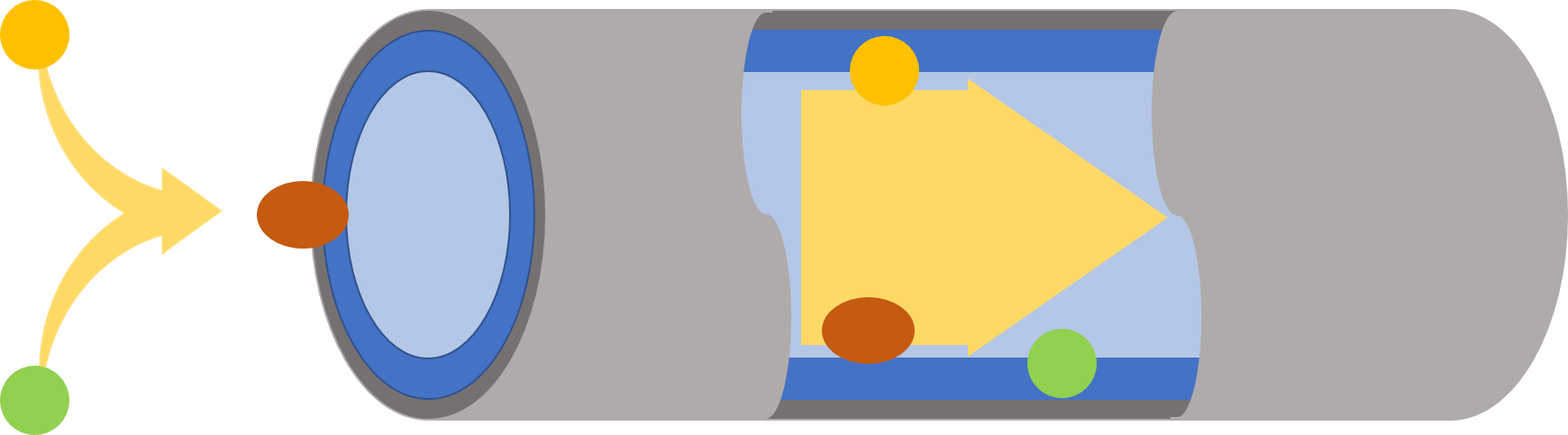
Oppositely charged particles interact as they are moved through a column. While paired there is less tendency to flow through the column, in reverse phase chromatography.

Ion interaction chromatography (ion-pair chromatography) is a laboratory technique for separating ions with chromatography. In this technique ions are mixed with ion pairing reagents (IPR). The analyte combines with its reciprocal ion in the IPR, this corresponds to retention time. Often organic salts are selected to pair with solute(s). The formation of this pair affects the interaction of the pair with the mobile phase and the stationary phase.

== See also ==
- Ion association
- Intimate ion pair
