= Hans Falkenhagen =

German physicist and electrochemist

Hans Falkenhagen (13 May 1895 – 26 June 1971) was a German physicist and electrochemist best known for eponymous Debye–Falkenhagen effect.

1955 he became a regular member of the German Academy of Sciences at Berlin and in 1962 a member of the German Academy of Sciences Leopoldina.

== Works ==
- Kohäsion und Zustandsgleichung von Dipolgasen, Dissertation, Göttingen 1920
- Paschen-Back-Effekt des H-Atoms, Habilitationsschrift, Köln 1924
- P. Debye und H. Falkenhagen: Dispersion der Leitfähigkeit starker Elektrolyte. In: Zeitschr. f. Elektrochem. 24, 1928, S. 562ff
- Zur Theorie der Gesamtkurve des Wien-Effekts. In: Phys. Zeitschr. 30, 1929, S. 163ff
- Das Wurzelgesetz der inneren Reibung starker Elektrolyte. In: Z. phys. Chem (Leipzig) B6, 1929, S. 159ff
- Elektrolyte. Hirzel, Leipzig 1932
- Die Naturwissenschaft in Lebensbildern großer Forscher. Hirzel, Stuttgart 1948
- Theorie der Elektrolyte. Hirzel, Stuttgart 1971
