= Theodore Shedlovsky =

Russian-born American chemist (1898–1976)

Dr. Theodore Shedlovsky (October 29, 1898 – November 5, 1976) was a Russian-born American chemist, a member of the National Academy of Sciences, noted for his work of applying electrochemistry to life processes and living cells. He is the author of Electrochemistry in Biology and Medicine (New York: Wiley, 1955).
