= Ionic atmosphere =

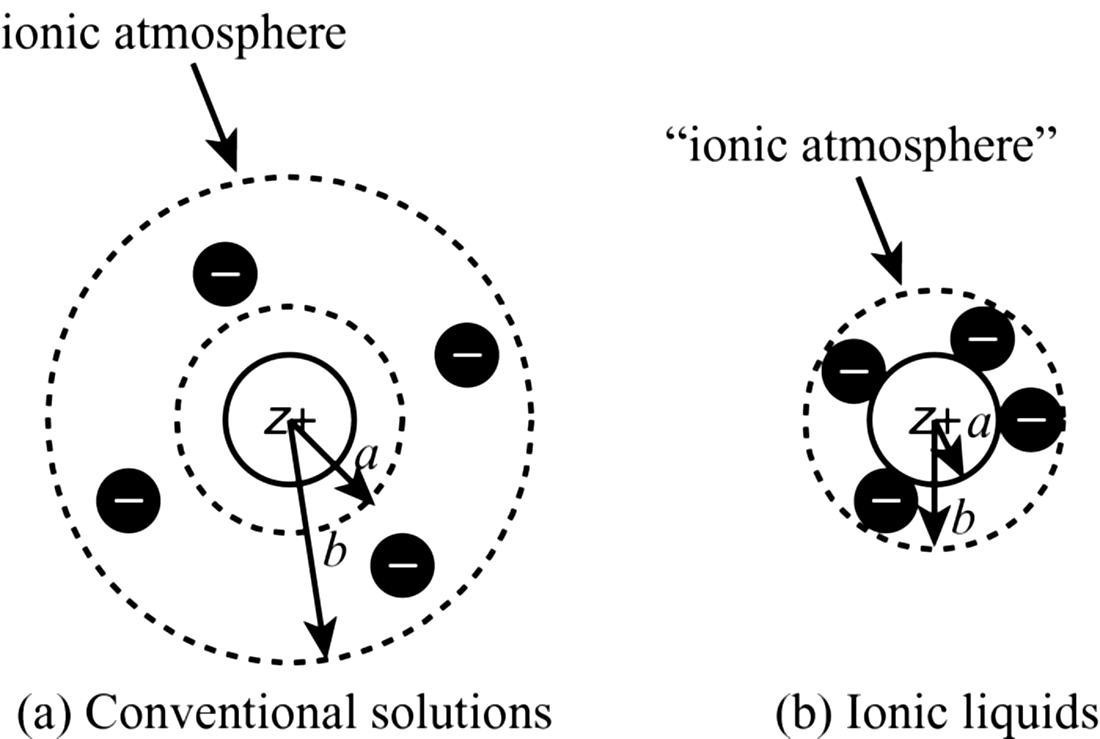
Ionic atmosphere is the area at which a charged entity is capable of attracting an entity of the opposite charge

Ionic Atmosphere is a concept employed in Debye–Hückel theory which explains the electrolytic conductivity behaviour of solutions. It can be generally defined as the area at which a charged entity is capable of attracting an entity of the opposite charge.

== Asymmetry, or relaxation effect ==
If an electrical potential is applied to an electrolytic solution, a positive ion will move towards the negative electrode and drag along an entourage of negative ions with it. The more concentrated the solution, the closer these negative ions are to the positive ion and thus the greater the resistance experienced by the positive ion. This influence on the speed of an ion is known as the "Asymmetry effect" because the ionic atmosphere moving around the ion is not symmetrical; the charge density behind is greater than in the front, slowing the motion of the ion. The time required to form a new ionic atmosphere on the right or time required for ionic atmosphere on the left to fade away is known as time of relaxation. The asymmetrization of ionic atmosphere does not occur in the case of Debye Falkenhagen effect due to high frequency dependence of conductivity.

== Electrophoretic effect ==
This is another factor which slows the motion of ions within a solution. It is the tendency of the applied potential to move the ionic atmosphere itself. This drags the solvent molecules along because of the attractive forces between ions and solvent molecules. As a result, the central ion at the centre of the ionic atmosphere is influenced to move towards the pole opposite its ionic atmosphere. This inclination retards its motion.

== Limits to the model ==
The model of ionic atmosphere is less adequate for concentrated ionic solutions near saturation. These solutions as well as molten salts or ionic liquids have a structure similar to the crystalline lattice where water molecules are located between ions.
