= Maxwell–Fricke equation =

The Maxwell–Fricke equation relates the resistivity of blood to hematocrit. This relationship has been shown to hold for humans, and a variety on non-human warm-blooded species, including canines.

== Equation ==
The Maxwell–Fricke equation is written as:

$$\frac{\frac{\rho_1}{\rho}-1}{\frac{\rho_1}{\rho}+2} = \varphi\frac{\frac{\rho_1}{\rho_2}-1}{\frac{\rho_1}{\rho_2}+2}$$

where ρ is the resistivity of blood, ρ_{1} is the resistivity of plasma, ρ_{2} is the resistivity of blood cells and φ is the hematocrit.
