= Debye–Falkenhagen effect =

Electrochemical effect

The increase in the conductivity of an electrolyte solution when the applied voltage has a very high frequency is known as Debye–Falkenhagen effect, named after Peter Debye and Hans Falkenhagen who published about it 1928. Impedance measurements on water-p-dioxane and the methanol-toluene systems have confirmed Falkenhagen's predictions made in 1929.

== See also ==
- Peter Debye
- Debye length
- Hans Falkenhagen
- Wien effect
