= Strong electrolyte =

Solute that (almost) completely ionizes or dissociates in solution

In chemistry, a strong electrolyte is a solute that completely, or almost completely, ionizes or dissociates in a solution. These ions are good conductors of electric current in the solution.

Originally, a "strong electrolyte" was defined as a chemical compound that, when in aqueous solution, is a good conductor of electricity. With a greater understanding of the properties of ions in solution, its definition was replaced by the present one.

A concentrated solution of this strong electrolyte has a lower vapor pressure than that of pure water at the same temperature. Strong acids, strong bases and soluble ionic salts that are not weak acids or weak bases are strong electrolytes.

== Writing reactions ==
For strong electrolytes, a single reaction arrow shows that the reaction occurs completely in one direction, in contrast to the dissociation of weak electrolytes, which both ionize and re-bond in significant quantities.

$\text{Strong electrolyte}_{\rm (aq)} \longrightarrow \text{Cation}^+_{\rm (aq)} + \text{Anion}^-_{\rm (aq)}$

Strong electrolytes conduct electricity only in aqueous solutions, or in molten salt, and ionic liquid. Strong electrolytes break apart into ions completely.

The strength of an electrolyte does not affect the open circuit voltage produced by a galvanic cell. But when electric current flows, stronger electrolytes result in smaller voltage losses through the electrolyte and therefore higher cell voltage.

== Examples ==
Strong acids

- Perchloric acid, HClO_{4}
- Hydriodic acid, HI
- Hydrobromic acid, HBr
- Hydrochloric acid, HCl
- Sulfuric acid, H_{2}SO_{4}
- Nitric acid, HNO_{3}
- Chloric acid, HClO_{3}
- Bromic acid, HBrO_{3}
- Perbromic acid, HBrO_{4}
- Periodic acid, HIO_{4}
- Fluoroantimonic acid, HSbF_{6}
- Magic acid, FSO_{3}HSbF_{5}
- Carborane superacid, H(CHB_{11}Cl_{11})
- Fluorosulfuric acid, FSO_{3}H
- Triflic acid, CF_{3}SO_{3}H

Strong bases

- Lithium hydroxide, LiOH
- Sodium hydroxide, NaOH
- Potassium hydroxide, KOH
- Rubidium hydroxide, RbOH
- Caesium hydroxide, CsOH
- Calcium hydroxide, Ca(OH)_{2}
- Strontium hydroxide, Sr(OH)_{2}
- Barium hydroxide, Ba(OH)_{2}
- Lithium diisopropylamide, (LDA) C_{6}H_{14}LiN
- Lithium diethylamide, (LDEA)
- Sodium amide, NaNH_{2}
- Sodium hydride, NaH
- Lithium bis(trimethylsilyl)amide, ((CH_{3})_{3}Si)_{2}NLi

Salts

- Sodium chloride, NaCl
- Potassium nitrate, KNO_{3}
- Magnesium chloride, MgCl_{2}
- Sodium acetate, CH_{3}COONa

== See also ==
- Aqueous solution
- Dissociation constant
- Electrolysis
- Electrolyte
- Ionic liquid
- Molten salt
- Supporting electrolyte (background electrolyte)
