= Concentration cell =

Galvanic cell

In battery technology, a concentration cell is a limited form of a galvanic cell that has two equivalent half-cells of the same composition differing only in concentrations. One can calculate the potential developed by such a cell using the Nernst equation. A concentration cell produces a small voltage as it attempts to reach chemical equilibrium, which occurs when the concentration of reactant in both half-cells are equal. Because an order of magnitude concentration difference produces less than 60 millivolts at room temperature, concentration cells are not typically used for energy storage.

A concentration cell generates electricity from the reduction in the thermodynamic free energy of the electrochemical system as the difference in the chemical concentrations in the two half-cells is reduced. The same reaction occurs in the half-cells but in opposite directions, increasing the lower and decreasing the higher concentration. The energy is generated from thermal energy that the cell absorbs as heat, as the electricity flows. This generation of electricity from ambient thermal energy, without a temperature gradient, is possible because the convergence of the chemical concentrations in the two half-cells increases entropy, and this increase more than compensates for the entropy decrease when heat is converted into electrical energy.

Concentration cell methods of chemical analysis compare a solution of known concentration with an unknown, determining the concentration of the unknown via the Nernst Equation or comparison tables against a group of standards.

The standard reduction and oxidation potentials for a concentration cell is 0V at standard conditions (1M solutions, 298K, 1 atm). This is because a concentration cell is designed to have identical electrodes immersed in solutions with different concentrations of the same ions, and at standard conditions, the electrode potentials of the half-cells are the same. Therefore, there is no net potential difference.

Concentration cell corrosion occurs when two or more areas of a metal surface are in contact with different concentrations of the same solution. There are two general types of concentration cells.

Concentration cells can be electrode concentration cells or electrolyte concentration cells.

Electrolyte Concentration cell - In this particular electrochemical cell, the electrodes within both half-cells consist of identical substances, while the electrolyte comprises a solution of the same substance, albeit with varying concentrations.

Electrode Concentration cell - In this particular electrochemical cell, two electrodes composed of the same substance but with differing concentrations are immersed in a common solution.

== Metal ion concentration cells ==
In the presence of water, a high concentration of metal ions will exist under the faying surfaces and a low concentration of metal ions will exist adjacent to the crevice created by the faying surfaces. An electrical potential will exist between the two points. The area of the metal in contact with the lower concentration of metal ions will be cathodic and will be protected, and the area of metal in contact with the higher metal ion concentration will be anodic and corroded.

== Oxygen concentration cells ==
Water in contact with the metal surface will normally contain dissolved oxygen. An oxygen cell can develop at any point where the oxygen in the air is not allowed to diffuse uniformly into the solution, thereby creating a difference in oxygen concentration between two points. Corrosion will occur at the area of low-oxygen concentration, which are anodic.

== Active-passive cells ==
If a metal is protected against corrosion by a tightly adhering passive film (usually an oxide) and salt deposits on the surface in the presence of water, the active metal beneath the film will be exposed to corrosive attack in areas where the passive film is broken. An electrical potential will develop between the large area of the passive film (cathode) and the small area of the exposed active metal (anode). Rapid pitting of the active metal will result.

== See also ==
- Activity coefficient
- Electrochemical potential
- Ion transport number
- ITIES
- Liquid junction potential
- Membrane potential
- Thermogalvanic cell
- Osmotic power
- Oxygen sensor § Zirconia sensor - an application of a concentration cell.
