= Thermogalvanic cell =

Electrochemical cell in which a temperature difference produces a voltage

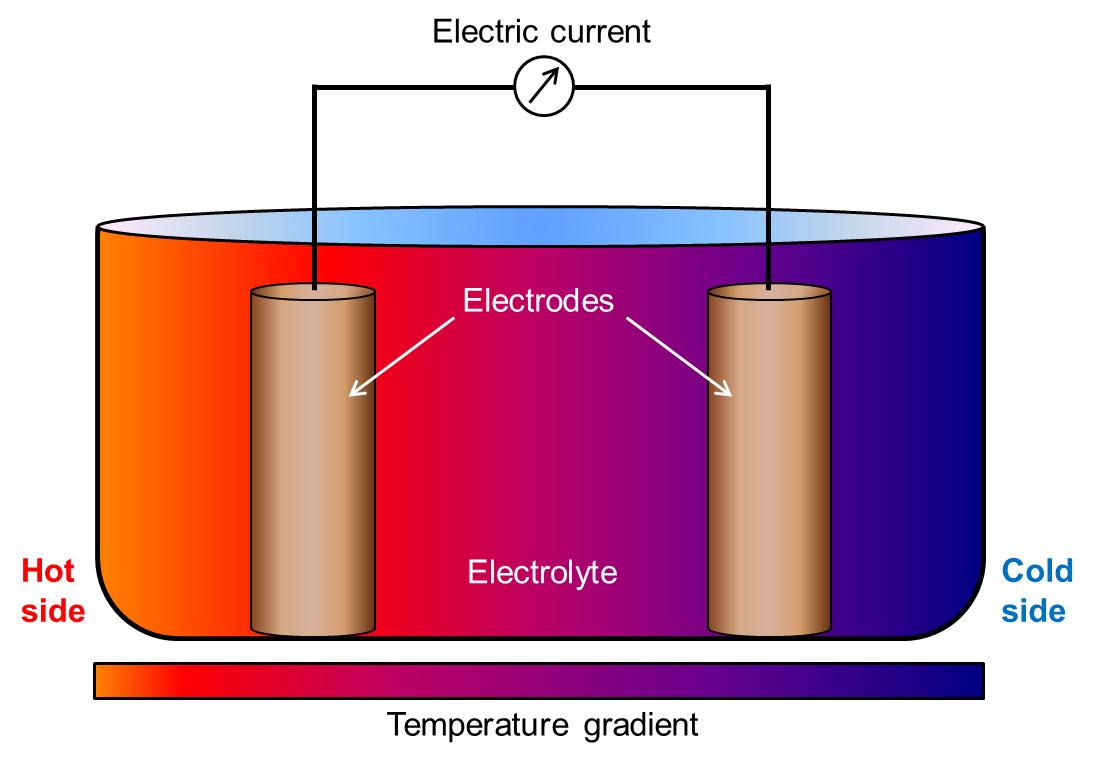
Thermogalvanic cell displaying the elements making up the cell

In electrochemistry, a thermogalvanic cell is a kind of galvanic cell in which heat is employed to provide electrical power directly. These cells are electrochemical cells in which the two electrodes are deliberately maintained at different temperatures. This temperature difference generates a potential difference between the electrodes. The electrodes can be of identical composition and the electrolyte solution homogeneous. This is usually the case in these cells. This is in contrast to galvanic cells in which electrodes and/or solutions of different compositions provide the electromotive potential. As long as there is a difference in temperature between the electrodes a current will flow through the circuit. A thermogalvanic cell can be seen as analogous to a concentration cell but instead of running on differences in the concentration/pressure of the reactants they make use of differences in the "concentrations" of thermal energy. The principal application of thermogalvanic cells is the production of electricity from low-temperature heat sources (waste heat and solar heat). Their energetic efficiency is low, in the range of 0.1% to 1% for conversion of heat into electricity.

== History ==
The use of heat to empower galvanic cells was first studied around 1880. However it was not until the 1950s that more serious research was undertaken in this field.

== Working mechanism ==
Thermogalvanic cells are a kind of heat engine. Ultimately the driving force behind them is the transport of entropy from the high temperature source to the low temperature sink. Therefore, these cells work thanks to a thermal gradient established between different parts of the cell. Because the rate and enthalpy of chemical reactions depend directly on the temperature, different temperatures at the electrodes imply different chemical equilibrium constants. This translates into unequal chemical equilibrium conditions on the hot side and on the cold side. The thermocell tries to approach a homogeneous equilibrium and, in doing so, produces a flow of chemical species and electrons. The electrons flow through the path of least resistance (the outer circuit) making it possible to extract power from the cell.

== Types ==
Different thermogalvanic cells have been constructed attending to their uses and properties. Usually they are classified according to the electrolyte employed in each specific type of cell.

=== Aqueous electrolytes ===
In these cells the electrolyte between the electrodes is a water solution of some salt or hydrophilic compound. An essential property of these compounds is that they must be able to undergo redox reactions in order to shuttle electrons from one electrode to the other during the cell operation.

=== Non-aqueous electrolytes ===
The electrolyte is a solution of some other solvent different from water. Solvents like methanol, acetone, dimethyl sulfoxide and dimethyl formamide have been successfully employed in thermogalvanic cells running on copper sulfate.

=== Molten salts ===
In this type of thermocell the electrolyte is some kind of salt with a relatively low melting point. Their use solves two problems. On one hand the temperature range of the cell is much larger. This is an advantage as these cells produce more power the larger the difference between the hot and cold sides. On the other hand, the liquid salt directly provides the anions and cations necessary for sustainment of a current through the cell. Therefore, no additional current-carrying compounds are necessary as the melted salt is the electrolyte itself. Typical hot source temperatures are between 600–900 K, but can get as high as 1730 K. Cold sink temperatures are in the 400–500 K range.

=== Solid electrolytes ===
Thermocells in which the electrolyte connecting the electrodes is an ionic material have been considered and constructed too. The temperature range is also elevated as compared to liquid electrolytes. Studied systems fall in the 400–900 K. Some solid ionic materials that have been employed to construct thermogalvanic cells are AgI, PbCl_{2} and PbBr_{2}.

== Uses ==
The main application of thermogalvanic cells is electricity production under conditions where excess heat is available. In particular thermogalvanic cells are being used in the following areas.

=== Solar energy ===
The heat collected from this process generates steam, which can be used in a conventional steam turbine system to make electricity. In contrast to the low-temperature solar thermal systems that are used for air or water heating in domestic or commercial buildings, these solar thermal electricity plants operate at high temperatures, requiring both concentrated sunlight and a large collection area, making the Moroccan desert an ideal location.

This is an alternative approach to the more widely used “photovoltaic” technology for producing electricity from sunlight. In a photovoltaic system, the sunlight is absorbed in the photovoltaic device (commonly called a solar cell) and energy is passed to electrons in the material, converting the solar energy directly into electricity. Sometimes, solar thermal electricity and photovoltaics are portrayed as competing technologies and, while this may be true when deciding on the way forward for a specific site, in general they are complementary, using solar energy as extensively as possible.

=== Waste heat sources ===
Thermogalvanic cells can be used to extract a useful quantity of energy from waste heat sources even when the temperature gradient is less than 100C (sometimes only a few tens of degrees). This is often the case in many industrial areas. Research has suggested that thermogalvanic hydrogel could be used to generate electricity from the heat produced by a mobile phone battery when the phone is using power, while also cooling the battery.

=== Cooling ===
Thermogalvanism uses chemical energy to move heat from a colder to a hotter body. It was claimed in 2025 that thermogalvanic cooling technology could be a sustainable alternative to the vapour compression technology used in refrigerators. It was claimed that the cooling power of hydrogalvanic cells could be improved by 70% by optimising electrolytes, and that this made cooling viable.

== See also ==
- Concentration cell
- Electrochemical cell
- Electrochemical potential
- Galvanic cell
- Ion transport number
- Alkali-metal thermal to electric converter
- Search for the Super Battery (2017 PBS film)
- Thermoelectric effect
- Thermoelectric generator
- OTEC
