= Slip joint =

A slip joint is a mechanical construction allowing extension and compression in a linear structure of slip joint.

== General forms ==
Slip joints can be designed to allow continuous relative motion of two components or it can allow an adjustment, by unclamping from one fixed position, and re-clamping to another. Examples of the latter are tripods, hiking poles, or similar telescoping device. The clamping mechanism is based on a cam, a set screw, or a similar locking mechanism. Slip joints can also be non-telescoping, such as the joints on some older wooden surveyor's levelling rods. These use a joint that keeps the sections offset from each other but able to be slid together for transport.

Examples of continuous slip joints are given below.

== Special purpose slip joints ==
=== Civil engineering ===
Slip joints in large structures are used to allow the independent motion of large components while enabling them to be joined in some way. For example, if two tall buildings are to be joined with a pedestrian skyway at some high level, there are two options in structural engineering. If the buildings are identical in mass and elasticity they will tend to respond similarly to ground motion induced by earthquakes. In this case, it may be appropriate to construct a rigid connection between the buildings, although this may require additional supporting members within the structures. On the other hand, a lower cost connection may be made by using a lightweight structure that is not coupled rigidly but instead is allowed to slide or "float" relative to one or both structures. This is especially suitable where the two structures may respond differently to ground motion. The structure will not be completely free to move but rather may use elastic materials to locate it near the center of its range of motion and viscous shock absorbers to absorb energy and to restrict the speed of relative motion. When a sliding connection is used it is extremely important that there be sufficient range of motion without failure to accommodate the maximum credible relative motion of the structures. Additional "fail-safe" flexible connections may be added to ensure that the structure does not fall, although it may be damaged to a point of being unserviceable or unrepairable.

Slip joints are common under conditions where temperature changes can cause expansion and contraction that may overstress a structure. These are generally referred to as expansion joints. Bridges and overpasses frequently have sliding joints that allow a deck to move relative to piers or abutments. The joints can be constructed with elastomeric pads that permit motion or can use rollers on flat surfaces to allow the ends to move smoothly. The exact details are limited by the imagination of the designer.

=== Mechanical engineering ===
Slip joints are sometimes found in tubular structures such as piping but are generally avoided for this application due to requirements for sealing against leakage, instead of using either a large loop that is allowed to flex or a semi-rigid bellow. Slip joints are used when the main problem is a large axial movement. Pipe supports often are slip joints to allow for the thermal expansion or contraction of the pipe relative to the support.

=== Wastewater plumbing ===
Slip joint connections are also commonly used in wastewater plumbing, most commonly under kitchen sinks. Here, the slip joint provides a water-tight seal for non-pressurized drainage, with adjustability to aid installation. The slip joint includes a gasket that fits snugly on a pipe end, with a threaded nut behind the gasket, but with gasket position adjustable as needed. This pipe end fits loosely into another with a flange for the gasket to seal against, and threads for the nut to clamp the gasket to the flange.

== See also ==
- Quill drive
- Slip critical joint
