= Galvanic cell =

Electrochemical device

Galvanic cell with no cation flow

A galvanic cell or voltaic cell, named after the scientists Luigi Galvani and Alessandro Volta, respectively, is an electrochemical cell in which an electric current is generated from spontaneous oxidation–reduction reactions. An example of a galvanic cell consists of two different metals, each immersed in separate beakers containing their respective metal ions in solution that are connected by a salt bridge or separated by a porous membrane.

Volta is the inventor of the voltaic pile, the first electrical battery. Common usage of the word battery has evolved to include a single galvanic cell, but the first batteries had many galvanic cells.

== History ==
In 1780, Luigi Galvani discovered that when two different metals (e.g., copper and zinc) are in contact and then both are touched at the same time to two different parts of a muscle of a frog leg, to close the circuit, the frog's leg contracts. He called this "animal electricity". The frog's leg, as well as being a detector of electrical current, was also the electrolyte (to use the language of modern chemistry).

A year after Galvani published his work (1790), Alessandro Volta showed that the frog was not necessary, using instead a force-based detector and brine-soaked paper (as electrolyte). Earlier Volta had established the expression of capacitance C = Q/V with force-based detectors. In 1799 Volta invented the voltaic pile, which is a stack of galvanic cells each consisting of a metal disk, an electrolyte layer, and a disk of a different metal. He built it entirely out of non-biological material to challenge Galvani's (and the later experimenter Leopoldo Nobili)'s animal electricity theory in favor of his own metal-metal contact electricity theory. Carlo Matteucci in his turn constructed a battery entirely out of biological material in answer to Volta. Volta's contact electricity view characterized each electrode with a number that we would now call the work function of the electrode. This view ignored the chemical reactions at the electrode-electrolyte interfaces, which include H_{2} formation on the more noble metal in Volta's pile.

Although Volta did not understand the operation of the battery or the galvanic cell, these discoveries paved the way for electrical batteries; Volta's cell was named an IEEE Milestone in 1999.

Some forty years later, Faraday (see Faraday's laws of electrolysis) showed that the galvanic cell—now often called a voltaic cell—was chemical in nature. Faraday introduced new terminology to the language of chemistry: electrode (cathode and anode), electrolyte, and ion (cation and anion). Thus Galvani incorrectly thought the source of electricity (or source of electromotive force (emf), or seat of emf) was in the animal, Volta incorrectly thought it was in the physical properties of the isolated electrodes, but Faraday correctly identified the source of emf as the chemical reactions at the two electrode-electrolyte interfaces.

It was suggested by Wilhelm König in 1940 that the object known as the Baghdad battery might represent galvanic cell technology from ancient Parthia. Replicas filled with citric acid or grape juice have been shown to produce a voltage. However, it is far from certain that this was its purpose—other scholars have pointed out that it is very similar to vessels known to have been used for storing parchment scrolls.

== Principles ==
Schematic of Zn–Cu galvanic cell

Galvanic cells are extensions of spontaneous redox reactions, but have been designed to harness the energy produced from said reaction. For example, when one immerses a strip of zinc metal (Zn) in an aqueous solution of copper sulfate (CuSO_{4}), dark-colored solid deposits will collect on the surface of the zinc metal and the blue color characteristic of the Cu^{2+} ion disappears from the solution. The depositions on the surface of the zinc metal consist of copper metal, and the solution now contains zinc ions. This reaction is represented by:

Zn(s) + Cu^{2+}(aq) → Zn^{2+}(aq) + Cu(s)

In this redox reaction, Zn is oxidized to Zn^{2+} and Cu^{2+} is reduced to Cu. When electrons are transferred directly from Zn to Cu^{2+}, the enthalpy of reaction is lost to the surroundings as heat. However, the same reaction can be carried out in a galvanic cell, allowing some of the chemical energy released to be converted into electrical energy. In its simplest form, a half-cell consists of a solid metal (called an electrode) that is submerged in a solution; the solution contains cations (+) of the electrode metal and anions (−) to balance the charge of the cations. The full cell consists of two half-cells, usually connected by a semi-permeable membrane or by a salt bridge that prevents the ions of the more noble metal from plating out at the other electrode.

A specific example is the Daniell cell (see figure), with a zinc (Zn) half-cell containing a solution of ZnSO_{4} (zinc sulfate) and a copper (Cu) half-cell containing a solution of CuSO_{4} (copper sulfate). A salt bridge is used here to complete the electric circuit.

If an external electrical conductor connects the copper and zinc electrodes, zinc from the zinc electrode dissolves into the solution as Zn^{2+} ions (oxidation), releasing electrons that enter the external conductor. To compensate for the increased zinc ion concentration, via the salt bridge zinc ions (cations) leave and sulfate ions (anions) enter the zinc half-cell. In the copper half-cell, the copper ions plate onto the copper electrode (reduction), taking up electrons that leave the external conductor. Since the Cu^{2+} ions (cations) plate onto the copper electrode, the latter is called the cathode. Correspondingly the zinc electrode is the anode. The electrochemical reaction is:

Zn(s) + Cu^{2+}(aq) → Zn^{2+}(aq) + Cu(s)

This is the same reaction as given in the previous example. In addition, electrons flow through the external conductor, which is the primary application of the galvanic cell.

As discussed under cell voltage, the electromotive force of the cell is the difference of the half-cell potentials, a measure of the relative ease of dissolution of the two electrodes into the electrolyte. The emf depends on both the electrodes and on the electrolyte, an indication that the emf is chemical in nature.

=== Half reactions and conventions ===
A half-cell contains a metal in two oxidation states. Inside an isolated half-cell, there is an oxidation-reduction (redox) reaction that is in chemical equilibrium, a condition written symbolically as follows (here, "M" represents a metal cation, an atom that has a charge imbalance due to the loss of n electrons):

M^{n+}_{(oxidized species)} + n e^{−} ⇌ M_{(reduced species)}

A galvanic cell consists of two half-cells, such that the electrode of one half-cell is composed of metal A, and the electrode of the other half-cell is composed of metal B; the redox reactions for the two separate half-cells are thus:

A^{n+} + n e^{−} ⇌ A
B^{m+} + m e^{−} ⇌ B

The overall balanced reaction is:

m A + n B^{m+} ⇌ n B + m A^{n+}

In other words, the metal atoms of one half-cell are oxidized while the metal cations of the other half-cell are reduced. By separating the metals in two half-cells, their reaction can be controlled in a way that forces transfer of electrons through the external circuit where they can do useful work. The electrodes are connected with a metal wire in order to conduct the electrons that participate in the reaction.

In one half-cell, dissolved metal B cations combine with the free electrons that are available at the interface between the solution and the metal B electrode; these cations are thereby neutralized, causing them to precipitate from solution as deposits on the metal B electrode, a process known as plating.

This reduction reaction causes the free electrons throughout the metal B electrode, the wire, and the metal A electrode to be pulled into the metal B electrode. Consequently, electrons are wrestled away from some of the atoms of the metal A electrode, as though the metal B cations were reacting directly with them; those metal A atoms become cations that dissolve into the surrounding solution.

As this reaction continues, the half-cell with the metal A electrode develops a positively charged solution (because the metal A cations dissolve into it), while the other half-cell develops a negatively charged solution (because the metal B cations precipitate out of it, leaving behind the anions); unabated, this imbalance in charge would stop the reaction. The solutions of the half-cells are connected by a salt bridge or a porous plate that allows ions to pass from one solution to the other, which balances the charges of the solutions and allows the reaction to continue.

By definition:

- The anode is the electrode where oxidation (loss of electrons) takes place (metal A electrode); in a galvanic cell, it is the negative electrode, because when oxidation occurs, electrons are left behind on the electrode. These electrons then flow through the external circuit to the cathode (positive electrode) (while in electrolysis, an electric current drives electron flow in the opposite direction and the anode is the positive electrode).
- The cathode is the electrode where reduction (gain of electrons) takes place (metal B electrode); in a galvanic cell, it is the positive electrode, as ions get reduced by taking up electrons from the electrode and plate out (while in electrolysis, the cathode is the negative terminal and attracts positive ions from the solution). In both cases, the statement 'the cathode attracts cations' is true.

By their nature, galvanic cells produce direct current.

The Weston cell has an anode composed of cadmium mercury amalgam, and a cathode composed of pure mercury. The electrolyte is a (saturated) solution of cadmium sulfate. The depolarizer is a paste of mercurous sulfate. When the electrolyte solution is saturated, the voltage of the cell is very reproducible; hence, in 1911, it was adopted as an international standard for voltage.

In the strictest sense, a battery is a set of two or more galvanic cells that are connected in series to form a single source of voltage. For instance, a typical 12 V lead–acid battery has six galvanic cells connected in series, with the anodes composed of lead and cathodes composed of lead dioxide, both immersed in sulfuric acid.

Large central office battery rooms – in a telephone exchange to provide power for subscribers' land-line telephones, for instance – may have many cells, connected both in series and parallel: Individual cells are connected in series as a battery of cells with some standard voltage (c. 40 V), and banks of such serial batteries, themselves connected in parallel, to provide adequate amperage to supply a typical peak demand for telephone connections.

=== Cell voltage ===
The voltage (electromotive force E^{o}) produced by a galvanic cell can be estimated from the standard Gibbs free energy change in the electrochemical reaction according to:

$$\ E_\mathsf{cell}^\mathsf{\ \!o} ~~=\ -\frac{\ \Delta_r G^\mathsf{\ \!o}\ }{\ \nu_\mathsf{e} F\ }\$$

where ν_{e} is the number of electrons transferred in the balanced half reactions, and F is Faraday's constant. However, it can be determined more conveniently by the use of a standard potential table for the two half cells involved. The first step is to identify the two metals and their ions reacting in the cell. Then one looks up the standard electrode potential, E^{o}, in volts, for each of the two half reactions. The standard potential of the cell is equal to the more positive E^{o} value minus the more negative E^{o} value.

For example, in the figure above the solutions are CuSO_{4} and ZnSO_{4}. Each solution has a corresponding metal strip in it, and a salt bridge or porous disk connecting the two solutions and allowing SO^{2−}_{4} ions to flow freely between the copper and zinc solutions. To calculate the standard potential one looks up copper and zinc's half reactions and finds:

Cu^{2+} + 2e^{−} ⇌ Cu ; E^{o} = +0.34 V
Zn^{2+} + 2e^{−} ⇌ Zn ; E^{o} = −0.76 V

Thus the overall reaction is:

Cu^{2+} + Zn ⇌ Cu + Zn^{2+}

The standard potential for the reaction is then +0.34 V − (−0.76 V) = +1.10 V . The polarity of the cell is determined as follows. Zinc metal is more strongly reducing than copper metal because the standard (reduction) potential for zinc is more negative than that of copper. Thus, zinc metal will lose electrons to copper ions and develop a positive electrical charge. The equilibrium constant, K, for the cell is given by:

$$\ \log_e K ~~=~~ \frac{~~~ \nu_\mathsf{e}\;\!F\ E_\mathsf{cell}^\mathsf{\ \!o}\ }{\ R\ T\ }\$$

where

F is the Faraday constant,
R is the gas constant, and
T is the absolute temperature in Kelvins.

For the Daniell cell K ≈ 1.5×10^{37} . Thus, at equilibrium, a few electrons are transferred, enough to cause the electrodes to be charged.

Actual half-cell potentials must be calculated by using the Nernst equation as the solutes are unlikely to be in their standard states:

$$\ E_\mathsf{\;\! half-cell} ~~=~~ E^\mathsf{\ \!o}\ -\ \frac{\ R\ T\ }{\ \nu_\mathsf{e}\ F\ }\ \log_e Q\$$

where Q is the reaction quotient. When the charges of the ions in the reaction are equal, this simplifies to:

$$\ E_{\;\! \mathsf{half-cell}} ~~=~~ E^\mathsf{\ \!o}\ -\ 2.303\ \frac{\ R\ T\ }{\ \nu_\mathsf{e} F\ }\ \log_{10} \left\{~~ \mathsf{M}^{n+} \right\}\$$

where M^{n+} is the activity of the metal ion in solution. In practice concentration in mol / L is used in place of activity. The metal electrode is in its standard state so by definition has unit activity. The potential of the whole cell is obtained as the difference between the potentials for the two half-cells, so it depends on the concentrations of both dissolved metal ions. If the concentrations are the same the Nernst equation is not needed, and $~ E_\mathsf{cell} ~=~ E_\mathsf{cell}^\mathsf{\;\!o} ~~$ under the conditions assumed here.

The value of 2.303 R / F is 1.9845×10^{−4} V / K , so at T = 25 °C (298.15 K) the half-cell potential will change by only (0.05918 V)/ ν_{e} if the concentration of a metal ion is increased or decreased by a factor of 10 .

$$\ E_{\;\! \mathsf{half-cell}} ~~=~~ E^\mathsf{\ \!o}\ -\ \frac{\ 0.05918\ \mathsf{V}\ }{\ \nu_\mathsf{e}\ } \log_{10} \left\{~~ \mathsf{M}^{n+} \right\}\$$

These calculations are based on the assumption that all chemical reactions are in equilibrium. When a current flows in the circuit, equilibrium conditions are not achieved and the cell voltage will usually be reduced by various mechanisms, such as the development of overpotentials. Also, since chemical reactions occur when the cell is producing power, the electrolyte concentrations change and the cell voltage is reduced. A consequence of the temperature dependency of standard potentials is that the voltage produced by a galvanic cell is also temperature dependent.

== Galvanic corrosion ==
Galvanic corrosion is the electrochemical erosion of metals. Corrosion occurs when two dissimilar metals are in contact with each other in the presence of an electrolyte, such as salt water. This forms a galvanic cell, with hydrogen gas forming on the more noble (less active) metal. The resulting electrochemical potential then develops an electric current that electrolytically dissolves the less noble material. A concentration cell can be formed if the same metal is exposed to two different concentrations of electrolyte.

== Types ==
- Concentration cell
- Electrolytic cell
- Electrochemical cell
- Lemon battery
- Thermogalvanic cell

== See also ==
- Bioelectrochemical reactor
- Resting potential
- Bio-nano generator
- Cell notation
- Desulfation
- Electrochemical engineering
- Electrode potential
- Electrohydrogenesis
- Electrosynthesis
- Enzymatic biofuel cell
- Galvanic series
- Isotope electrochemistry
- List of battery types
- Sacrificial anode
