= Salt bridge =

Laboratory device used for electrochemistry

An electrochemical cell (resembling a Daniell cell) with a filter paper salt bridge. The paper has been soaked with a Potassium nitrate solution.

In electrochemistry, a salt bridge or ion bridge is an essential laboratory device to minimize and stabilize the liquid junction potential between the solutions in an electrochemical cell, and reduce cross-contamination between the two half cells. It contains an electrolyte solution, typically an inert solution, used to connect the oxidation and reduction half-cells of a galvanic cell (voltaic cell), a type of electrochemical cell. In short, it functions as an ionically-conducting link connecting the anode and cathode half-cells within the electrochemical cell. The salt bridge has been in use for more than 100 years.

As shown in the figure on the right, a salt bridge typically consists of tubes filled with an electrolyte solution. These tubes often have diaphragms - such as glass frits - at their ends to help contain the solution within the tubes and prevent excessive mixing with the surrounding environment. When setting up a salt bridge between different solvents of half-cells, it is crucial to ensure that the electrolyte used in the bridge is soluble in both solutions and does not interact with any species present in either solutions.

A salt bridge filled with a solution of a single salt minimizes the liquid junction potential most efficiently when the following conditions are met:

1. The diffusion coefficients of the salt's anion and cation are almost equal at the selected concentration. K^{+}, NH_{4}^{+}, Rb^{+}, Cl^{-} and NO_{3}^{-} are most often used as anions and cation of the ion bridge salts with different solvents.
2. The salt concentration in the ion bridge is much higher than in the working solutions, which it connects. This minimizes the effects of the catholyte and anolyte compositions on the measured voltage difference.

Traditionally, concentrated aqueous potassium chloride (KCl) solution has been most often used to minimize the liquid-junction potential. When comparing other salt solutions such as potassium bromide and potassium iodide to potassium chloride, potassium chloride is the most efficient in nullifying the junction potential. Yet, the effectiveness of this salt bridge decreases as the ionic strength of the working solutions (catholyte and anolyte) increases.

== Types of salt bridges of various designs ==
There are several designs of salt bridges: glass tube bridges (traditional KCl-type salt bridge and ionic liquid salt bridge, as shown in the Figure), filter paper bridges, porous frit salt bridges, fumed-silica, and agar gel salt bridges.

=== Glass tube salt bridges ===
Glass tube salt bridges commonly consist of U-shaped Vycor tubes filled with a relatively inert electrolyte. The electrolyte solution usually comprises a combination of cations, such as ammonium and potassium, and anions, including chloride and nitrate, which have similar mobility. The combination is chosen which does not react with any of the chemicals used in the cell.

=== Ionic liquid salt bridges ===
Due to the numerous drawbacks of KCl-type salt bridges, ionic liquid salt bridges (ILSB) have been utilized to address the potentiometry issues arising from KCl-type salt bridges in electrochemical cells. ILSBs demonstrate efficient performance in aqueous solutions of hydrophilic electrolytes. This is because ionic liquids do not mix with water (they are immiscible), rendering them suitable as salt bridges for aqueous solutions. Additionally, they are chemically inert and highly stable in water.

The labeled salt bridge shows the U-shaped glass tube used as a salt bridge.

To set up a glass tube salt bridge, a U-shaped Vycor tube is fashioned to contain a suitable electrolyte solution. Normally, glass frits, a porous material, cover the ends of the tube or the electrolyte is often gelified with agar-agar to help prevent the intermixing of fluids that might otherwise occur.

The conductivity of a glass tube bridge primarily depends on the concentration of the electrolyte solution. At concentrations below saturation, an increase in concentration enhances conductivity. However, salt amount beyond-saturation in a narrow tube diameter may both reduce conductivity.

== Filter paper bridges ==
Porous paper such as filter paper may be used as a salt bridge if soaked in an appropriate electrolyte such as the electrolytes used in glass tube bridges. No gelification agent is required as the filter paper provides a solid medium for conduction.

The conductivity of this kind of salt bridge depends on a number of factors: the concentration of the electrolyte solution, the texture of the paper, and the absorbing ability of the paper. Generally, smoother texture and higher absorbency equate to higher conductivity.

To set up this type of salt bridge, laboratory filter paper can be used and rolled to form a shape that connects the two half-cells, typically rolled into a cylindrical shape. The rolled filter paper is then soaked in an appropriate inert salt solution. A straw can be used to shape the rolled filter paper into a U-shaped tube, providing mechanical strength to the soaked filter paper. This filter paper can now be used to act as a salt bridge and connect the two half-cells.

While filter paper salt bridges are inexpensive and easily accessible, one disadvantage of not using a straw to provide mechanical strength is that a new rolled and soaked filter paper must be used for each experiment. Additionally, filter paper has limited longevity and poses a high risk of contamination.

== Charcoal salt bridges ==
A recent development is the charcoal salt bridge. It is considered an excellent option for a porous junction for the reference electrode in an alkaline solution.

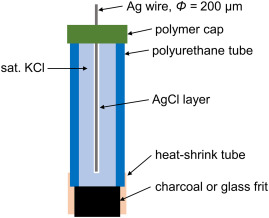
Charcoal (black box at the bottom of the cell) acts as a salt bridge to allow ion transfer.

A porous junction serves as a salt bridge between the two half-cells of reference and electrolyte solutions. Other materials used for porous junctions, such as glass, Teflon, and agar gel, have their own benefits but also some significant drawbacks such as high cost and high risk of contamination.

Therefore, the advantages of using charcoal as frits include its low cost and easy accessibility, as charcoal can be sourced from porous carbon materials. Despite being fragile, charcoal facilitates efficient ion transfer due to its highly porous structure.

== See also ==
- Liquid junction potential
- Ion transport number
