= Electroplating =

Electrochemical process for coating with metal

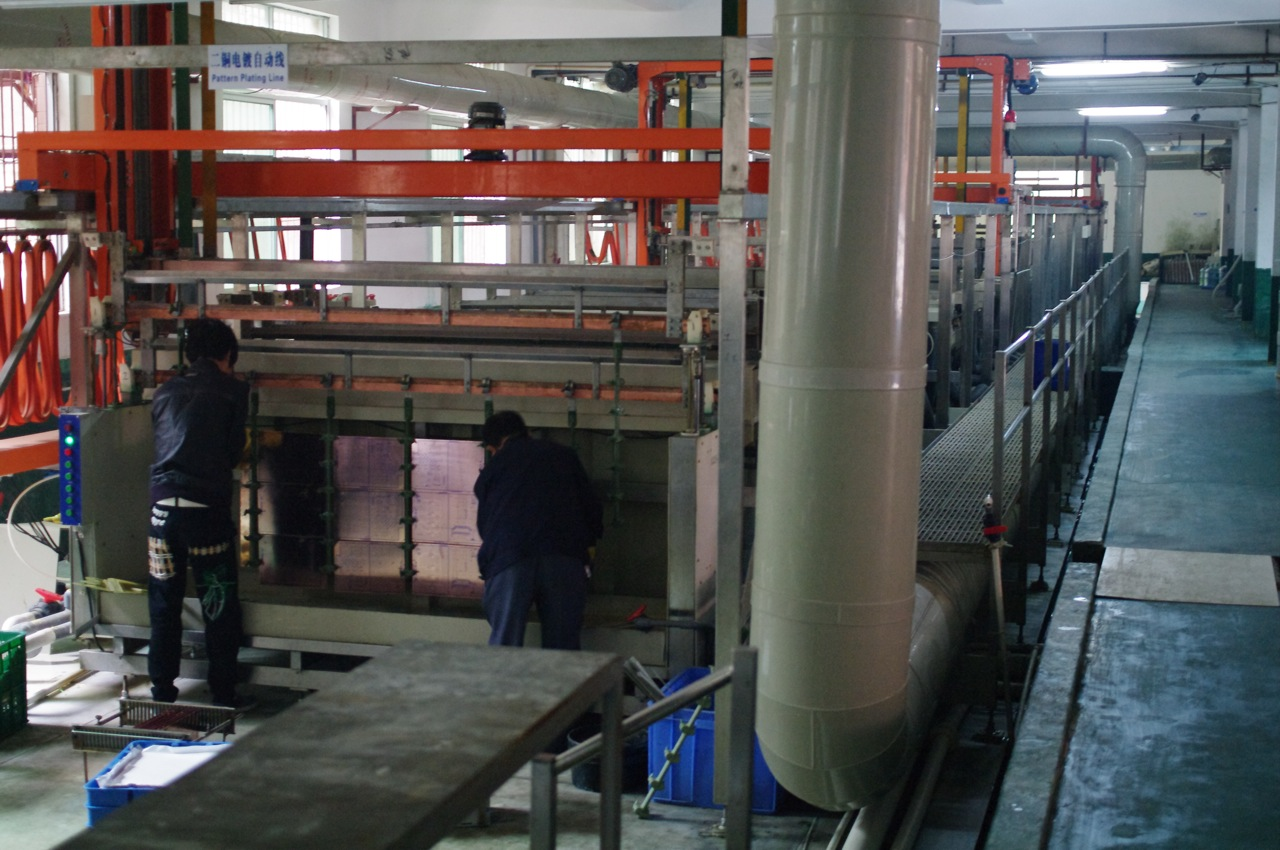
Copper electroplating machine for layering PCBs

Electroplating, also known as electrochemical deposition or electrodeposition, is a process for producing a metal coating on a solid substrate through the reduction of cations of that metal by means of a direct electric current. The part that needs to be coated acts as the cathode (negative electrode) of an electrolytic cell; the electrolyte is a solution of a salt whose cation is the metal to be coated, and the anode (positive electrode) is usually either a block of that metal, or of some inert conductive material. The current is provided by an external power supply.

Electroplating is widely used in industry and decorative arts to improve the surface qualities of objects—such as resistance to abrasion and corrosion, lubricity, reflectivity, electrical conductivity, or appearance. It is used to build up thickness on undersized or worn-out parts and to manufacture metal plates with complex shape, a process called electroforming. It is used to deposit copper and other conductors in forming printed circuit boards and copper interconnects in integrated circuits. It is also used to purify metals such as copper.

The aforementioned electroplating of metals uses an electroreduction process (that is, a negative or cathodic current is on the working electrode). The term "electroplating" is also used occasionally for processes that occur under electro-oxidation (i.e positive or anodic current on the working electrode), although such processes are more commonly referred to as anodizing rather than electroplating. One such example is the formation of silver chloride on silver wire in chloride solutions to make silver/silver-chloride (AgCl) electrodes.

Electropolishing, a process that uses an electric current to selectively remove the outermost layer from the surface of a metal object, is the reverse of the process of electroplating.

Throwing power is an important parameter that provides a measure of the uniformity of electroplating current, and consequently the uniformity of the electroplated metal thickness, on regions of the part that are near to the anode compared to regions that are far from it. It depends mostly on the composition and temperature of the electroplating solution, as well as on the operating current density. A higher throwing power of the plating bath results in a more uniform coating.

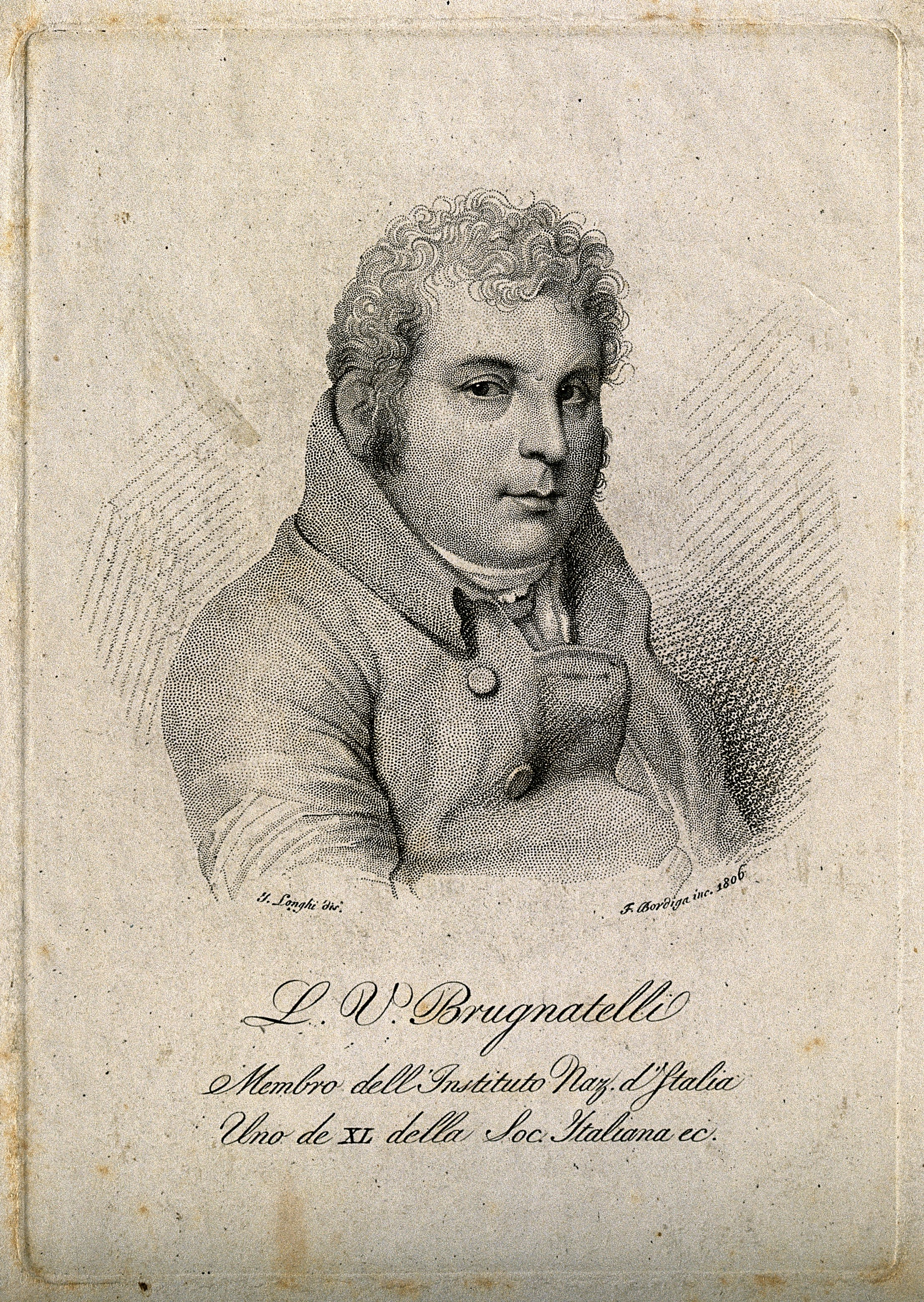
Luigi Valentino Brugnatelli

== History ==
Electroplating was invented in Europe by Italian chemist Luigi Valentino Brugnatelli in 1805. Brugnatelli used his colleague Alessandro Volta's invention of five years earlier, the voltaic pile, to facilitate the first electrodeposition. Brugnatelli's inventions were suppressed by the French Academy of Sciences and did not become used in general industry for the following thirty years. By 1839, scientists in Britain and Russia had independently devised metal-deposition processes similar to Brugnatelli's for the copper electroplating of printing press plates.

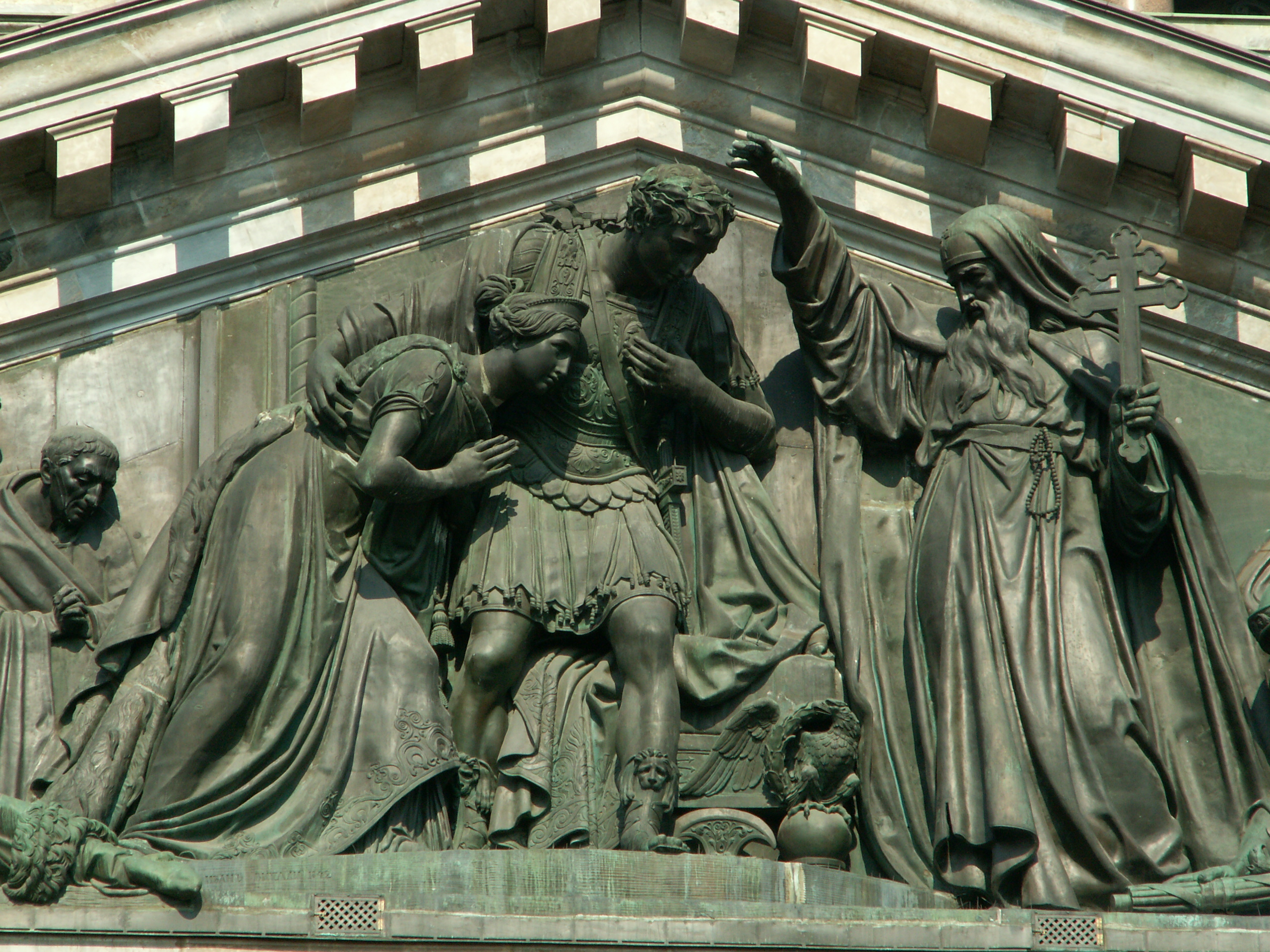
Galvanoplastic sculpture on St. Isaac's Cathedral in Saint Petersburg

Research from the 1930s had theorized that electroplating might have been performed in the Parthian Empire using a device resembling a Baghdad Battery, but this has since been refuted; the items were fire-gilded using mercury.

Boris Jacobi in Russia not only rediscovered galvanoplastics, but developed electrotyping and galvanoplastic sculpture. Galvanoplastics quickly came into fashion in Russia, with such people as inventor Peter Bagration, scientist Heinrich Lenz, and science-fiction author Vladimir Odoyevsky all contributing to further development of the technology. Among the most notorious cases of electroplating usage in mid-19th century Russia were the gigantic galvanoplastic sculptures of St. Isaac's Cathedral in Saint Petersburg and gold-electroplated dome of the Cathedral of Christ the Saviour in Moscow, the third tallest Orthodox church in the world.

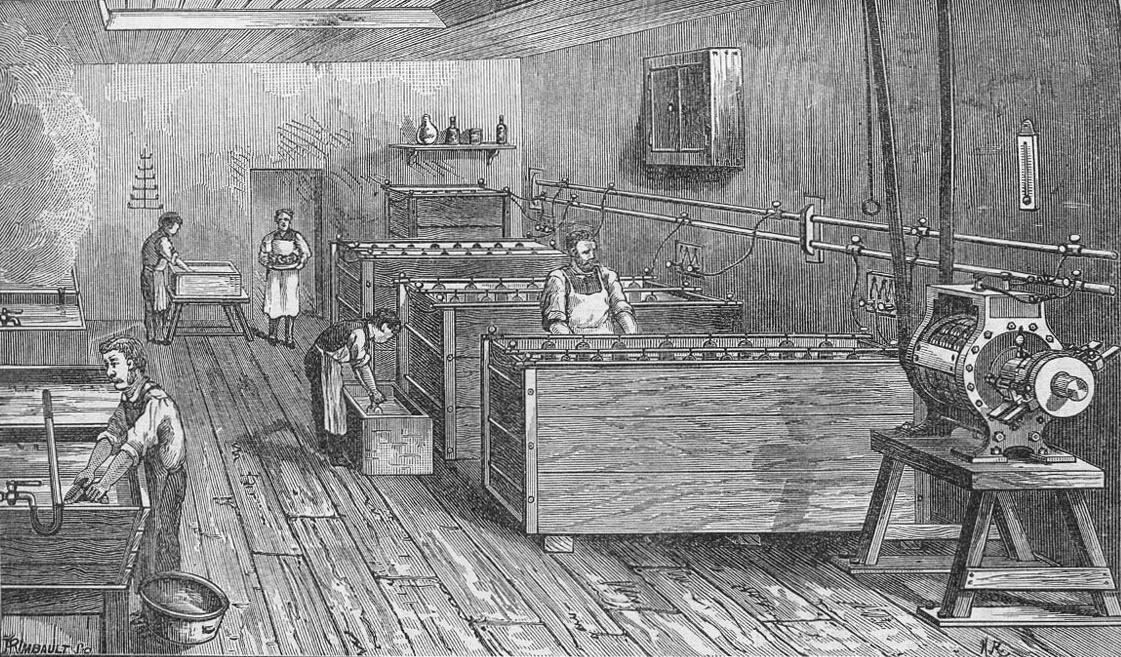
Nickel plating

Soon after, John Wright of Birmingham, England discovered that potassium cyanide was a suitable electrolyte for gold and silver electroplating. Wright's associates, George Elkington and Henry Elkington were awarded the first patents for electroplating in 1840. These two then founded the electroplating industry in Birmingham from where it spread around the world. The Woolrich Electrical Generator of 1844, now in Thinktank, Birmingham Science Museum, is the earliest electrical generator used in industry. It was used by Elkingtons.

The Norddeutsche Affinerie in Hamburg was the first modern electroplating plant starting its production in 1876.

As the science of electrochemistry grew, its relationship to electroplating became understood and other types of non-decorative metal electroplating were developed. Commercial electroplating of nickel, brass, tin, and zinc were developed by the 1850s. Electroplating baths and equipment based on the patents of the Elkingtons were scaled up to accommodate the plating of numerous large-scale objects and for specific manufacturing and engineering applications.

The plating industry received a big boost with the advent of the development of electric generators in the late 19th century. With the higher currents available, metal machine components, hardware, and automotive parts requiring corrosion protection and enhanced wear properties, along with better appearance, could be processed in bulk.

The two World Wars and the growing aviation industry gave impetus to further developments and refinements, including such processes as hard chromium plating, bronze alloy plating, sulfamate nickel plating, and numerous other plating processes. Plating equipment evolved from manually operated tar-lined wooden tanks to automated equipment capable of processing thousands of kilograms per hour of parts.

One of the American physicist Richard Feynman's first projects was to develop technology for electroplating metal onto plastic. Feynman developed the original idea of his friend into a successful invention, allowing his employer (and friend) to keep commercial promises he had made but could not have fulfilled otherwise.

== Process ==
Simplified diagram for electroplating copper (orange) on a conductive object (the cathode, "Me", gray). The electrolyte is a solution of copper sulfate, CuSO_{4} in sulfuric acid. A copper anode is used to replenish the electrolyte with copper cations Cu^{2+} as they are plated out at the cathode.

The electrolyte in the electrolytic plating cell should contain positive ions (cations) of the metal to be deposited. These cations are reduced at the cathode to the metal in the zero valence state. For example, the electrolyte for copper electroplating can be a solution of copper(II) sulfate, which dissociates into Cu^{2+} cations and SO^{2−}_{4} anions. At the cathode, the Cu^{2+} is reduced to metallic copper by gaining two electrons.

When the anode is made of the metal that is intended for coating onto the cathode, the opposite reaction may occur at the anode, turning it into dissolved cations. For example, copper would be oxidized at the anode to Cu^{2+} by losing two electrons. In this case, the rate at which the anode is dissolved will equal the rate at which the cathode is plated, and thus the ions in the electrolyte bath are continuously replenished by the anode. The net result is the effective transfer of metal from the anode to the cathode.

The anode may instead be made of a material that resists electrochemical oxidation, such as lead or carbon. Oxygen, hydrogen peroxide, and some other byproducts are then produced at the anode instead. In this case, ions of the metal to be plated must be replenished (continuously or periodically) in the bath as they are drawn out of the solution.

The plating is most commonly a single metallic element, not an alloy. However, some alloys can be electrodeposited, notably brass and solder. Plated "alloys" are not "true alloys" (solid solutions), but rather they are tiny crystals of the elemental metals being plated. In the case of plated solder, it is sometimes deemed necessary to have a true alloy, and the plated solder is melted to allow the tin and lead to combine into a true alloy. The true alloy is more corrosion-resistant than the as-plated mixture.

Many plating baths include cyanides of other metals (such as potassium cyanide) in addition to cyanides of the metal to be deposited. These free cyanides facilitate anode corrosion, help to maintain a constant metal ion level, and contribute to conductivity. Additionally, non-metal chemicals such as carbonates and phosphates may be added to increase conductivity.

When plating is not desired on certain areas of the substrate, stop-offs are applied to prevent the bath from coming in contact with the substrate. Typical stop-offs include tape, foil, lacquers, and waxes.

=== Strike ===
Initially, a special plating deposit called a strike or flash may be used to form a very thin (typically less than 0.1 μm thick) plating with high quality and good adherence to the substrate. This serves as a foundation for subsequent plating processes. A strike uses a high current density and a bath with a low ion concentration. The process is slow, so more efficient plating processes are used once the desired strike thickness is obtained.

The striking method is also used in combination with the plating of different metals. If it is desirable to plate one type of deposit onto a metal to improve corrosion resistance but this metal has inherently poor adhesion to the substrate, then a strike can be first deposited that is compatible with both. One example of this situation is the poor adhesion of electrolytic nickel on zinc alloys, in which case a copper strike is used, which has good adherence to both.

=== Pulse electroplating ===
The pulse electroplating or pulse electrodeposition (PED) process involves the swift alternating of the electrical potential or current between two different values, resulting in a series of pulses of equal amplitude, duration, and polarity, separated by zero current. By changing the pulse amplitude and width, it is possible to change the deposited film's composition and thickness.

The experimental parameters of pulse electroplating usually consist of peak current/potential, duty cycle, frequency, and effective current/potential. Peak current/potential is the maximum setting of electroplating current or potential. Duty cycle is the effective portion of time in a certain electroplating period with the current or potential applied. The effective current/potential is calculated by multiplying the duty cycle and peak value of the current or potential. Pulse electroplating could help to improve the quality of electroplated film and release the internal stress built up during fast deposition. A combination of the short duty cycle and high frequency could decrease surface cracks. However, in order to maintain the constant effective current or potential, a high-performance power supply may be required to provide high current/potential and a fast switch. Another common problem of pulse electroplating is that the anode material could get plated and contaminated during the reverse electroplating, especially for a high-cost, inert electrode such as platinum.

Other factors that affect the pulse electroplating include temperature, anode-to-cathode gap, and stirring. Sometimes, pulse electroplating can be performed in a heated electroplating bath to increase the deposition rate, since the rate of most chemical reactions increases exponentially with temperature per the Arrhenius law. The anode-to-cathode gap is related to the current distribution between anode and cathode. A small gap-to-sample-area ratio may cause uneven distribution of current and affect the surface topology of the plated sample. Stirring may increase the transfer/diffusion rate of metal ions from the bulk solution to the electrode surface. The ideal stirring setting varies for different metal electroplating processes.

=== Brush electroplating ===
A closely related process is brush electroplating, in which localized areas or entire items are plated using a brush saturated with plating solution. The brush, typically a graphite body wrapped with an absorbent cloth material that both holds the plating solution and prevents direct contact with the item being plated, is connected to the anode of a low-voltage and 3-4 ampere direct-current power source, and the item to be plated (the cathode) is grounded. The operator dips the brush in plating solution and then applies it to the item, moving the brush continually to get an even distribution of the plating material.

Brush electroplating has several advantages over tank plating, including portability, the ability to plate items that for some reason cannot be tank plated (one application was the plating of portions of very large decorative support columns in a building restoration), low or no masking requirements, and comparatively low plating solution volume requirements. It is mainly used industrially in part repair, with worn bearing surfaces getting a nickel or silver deposit. With technological advancement deposits up to .025" have been achieved and retained uniformity. Disadvantages compared to tank plating can include greater operator involvement (tank plating can frequently be done with minimal attention and the solutions used are often toxic), and the inconsistency in achieving as great a plate thickness.

=== Barrel plating ===
This technique of electroplating is one of the most common used in the industry for large numbers of small objects. The objects are placed in a barrel-shaped non-conductive cage and then immersed in a chemical bath containing dissolved ions of the metal that is to be plated onto them. The barrel is then rotated, and electrical currents are run through the various pieces in the barrel, which complete circuits as they touch one another. The result is a very uniform and efficient plating process, though the finish on the end products will likely suffer from abrasion during the plating process. It is unsuitable for highly ornamental or precisely engineered items.

=== Cleanliness ===
Cleanliness is essential to successful electroplating, since molecular layers of oil can prevent adhesion of the coating. ASTM B322 is a standard guide for cleaning metals prior to electroplating. Cleaning includes solvent cleaning, hot alkaline detergent cleaning, electrocleaning, ultrasonic cleaning and acid treatment. The most common industrial test for cleanliness is the waterbreak test, in which the surface is thoroughly rinsed and held vertical. Hydrophobic contaminants such as oils cause the water to bead and break up, allowing the water to drain rapidly. Perfectly clean metal surfaces are hydrophilic and will retain an unbroken sheet of water that does not bead up or drain off. ASTM F22 describes a version of this test. This test does not detect hydrophilic contaminants, but electroplating can displace these easily, since the solutions are water-based. Surfactants such as soap reduce the sensitivity of the test and must be thoroughly rinsed off.

== Test cells and characterization ==
=== Throwing power ===
Throwing power (or macro throwing power) is an important parameter that provides a measure of the uniformity of electroplating current, and consequently the uniformity of the electroplated metal thickness, on regions of the part that are near the anode compared to regions that are far from it. It depends mostly on the composition and temperature of the electroplating solution. Micro throwing power refers to the extent to which a process can fill or coat small recesses such as through-holes. Throwing power can be characterized by the dimensionless Wagner number:

$$\text{Wa} = \frac{RT\kappa}{FL\alpha|i|},$$

where R is the universal gas constant, T is the operating temperature, κ is the ionic conductivity of the plating solution, F is the Faraday constant, L is the equivalent size of the plated object, α is the transfer coefficient, and i the surface-averaged total (including hydrogen evolution) current density. The Wagner number quantifies the ratio of kinetic to ohmic resistances. A higher Wagner number produces a more uniform deposition. This can be achieved in practice by decreasing the size (L) of the plated object, reducing the current density |i|, adding chemicals that lower α (make the electric current less sensitive to voltage), and raising the solution conductivity (e.g. by adding acid). Concurrent hydrogen evolution usually improves the uniformity of electroplating by increasing |i|; however, this effect can be offset by blockage due to hydrogen bubbles and hydroxide deposits.

The Wagner number is rather difficult to measure accurately; therefore, other related parameters, that are easier to obtain experimentally with standard cells, are usually used instead. These parameters are derived from two ratios: the ratio M = m_{1} / m_{2} of the plating thickness of a specified region of the cathode "close" to the anode to the thickness of a region "far" from the cathode and the ratio L = x_{2} / x_{1} of the distances of these regions through the electrolyte to the anode. In a Haring-Blum cell, for example, L = 5 for its two independent cathodes, and a cell yielding plating thickness ratio of M = 6 has Harring-Blum throwing power 100% × (L − M) / L = −20%. Other conventions include the Heatley throwing power 100% × (L − M) / (L − 1), Field throwing power 100% × (L − M) / (L + M − 2), and Luke throwing power 100% × L / (L + M − 1). A more uniform thickness is obtained by making the throwing power larger (less negative), except for Luke's throwing power, which has the advantage of having a minimum of 0 and a maximum of 100, in terms of the less negative value, according to any of these definitions.

Parameters that describe cell performance such as throwing power are measured in small test cells of various designs that aim to reproduce conditions similar to those found in the production plating bath.

=== Haring–Blum cell ===
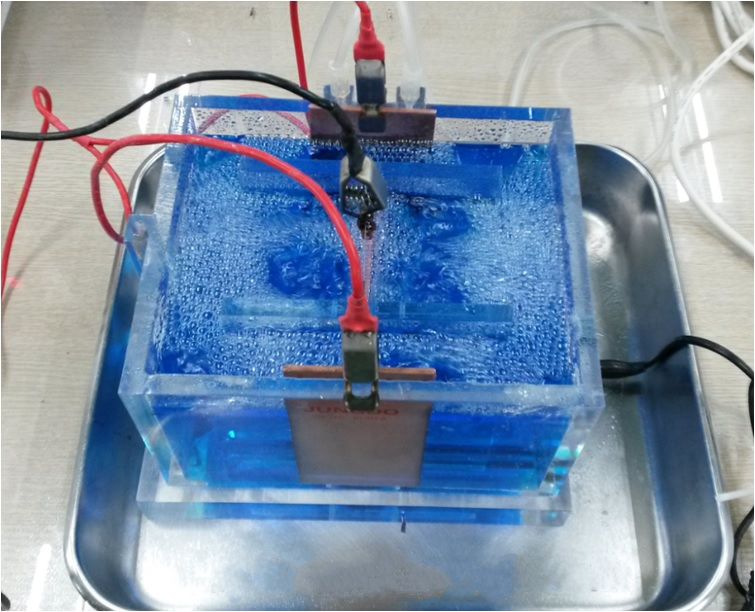
Haring–Blum cell

The Haring–Blum cell is used to determine the macro throwing power of a plating bath. The cell consists of two parallel cathodes with a fixed anode in the middle. The cathodes are at distances from the anode in the ratio of 1:5. The macro throwing power is calculated from the thickness of plating at the two cathodes when a direct current is passed for a specific period of time. The cell is fabricated out of perspex or glass.

=== Hull cell ===
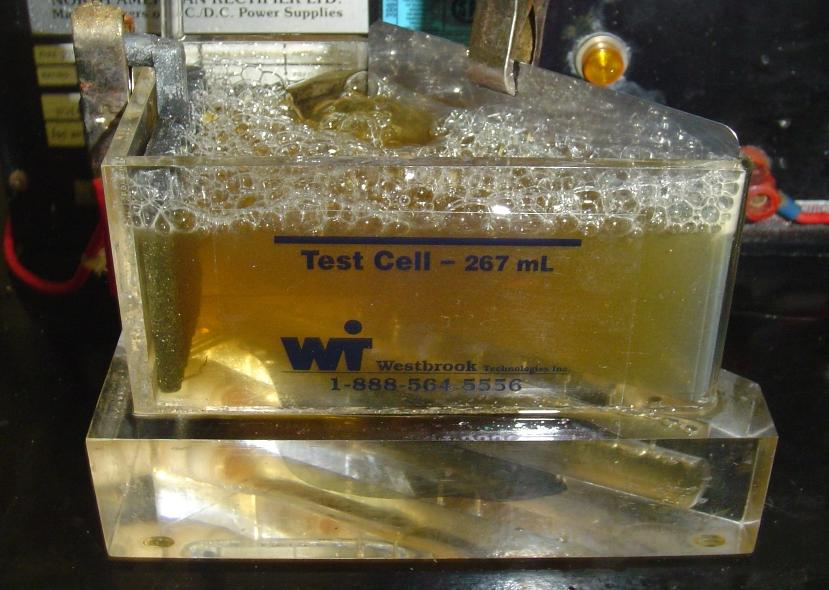
A zinc solution tested in a Hull cell

The Hull cell is a type of test cell used to semi-quantitatively check the condition of an electroplating bath. It measures useable current density range, optimization of additive concentration, recognition of impurity effects, and indication of macro throwing power capability. The Hull cell replicates the plating bath on a lab scale. It is filled with a sample of the plating solution and an appropriate anode which is connected to a rectifier. The "work" is replaced with a Hull cell test panel that will be plated to show the "health" of the bath.

The Hull cell is a trapezoidal container that holds 267 milliliters of a plating bath solution. This shape allows one to place the test panel on an angle to the anode. As a result, the deposit is plated at a range current densities along its length, which can be measured with a Hull cell ruler. The solution volume allows for a semi-quantitative measurement of additive concentration: 1 gram addition to 267 mL is equivalent to 0.5 oz/gal in the plating tank.

== Effects ==
Electroplating alters the chemical, physical, and mechanical properties of a workpiece. Chemically, coatings such as nickel can improve corrosion resistance. Physically, electroplating can change the outward appearance of a surface, including its brightness, reflectivity, or color. Mechanically, deposited layers can modify characteristics such as tensile strength and surface hardness, which are critical in applications such as tooling.

For example, electroplating acid gold onto copper- or nickel-plated circuitry can lower contact resistance while increasing surface hardness. Copper-plated areas on mild steel can also serve as masking regions during case hardening to prevent localized hardening. Tin-plated steel is often finished with a thin chromium layer to prevent surface dulling caused by tin oxidation.

== Alternatives ==
There are a number of alternative processes to produce metallic coatings on solid substrates that do not involve electrolytic reduction:

- Electroless deposition uses a bath containing metal ions and chemicals that will reduce them to the metal by redox reactions. The reaction should be autocatalytic, so that new metal will be deposited over the growing coating, rather than precipitated as a powder through the whole bath at once. Electroless processes are widely used to deposit nickel-phosphorus or nickel-boron alloys for wear and corrosion resistance, silver for mirror-making, copper for printed circuit boards, and many more. A major advantage of these processes over electroplating is that they can produce coatings of uniform thickness over surfaces of arbitrary shape, even inside holes, and the substrate need not be electrically conducting. Another major benefit is that they do not need power sources or specially shaped anodes. Disadvantages include lower deposition speed, consumption of relatively expensive chemicals, and a limited choice of coating metals.
- Immersion coating processes exploit displacement reactions in which the substrate metal is oxidized to soluble ions while ions of the coating metal get reduced and deposited in its place. This process is limited to very thin coatings, since the reaction stops after the substrate has been completely covered. Nevertheless, it has some important applications, such as the electroless nickel immersion gold (ENIG) process used to obtain gold-plated electrical contacts on printed circuit boards.
- Sputtering uses an electron beam or a plasma to eject microscopic particles of the metal onto the substrate in a vacuum.
- Physical vapor deposition transfer the metal onto the substrate by evaporating it.
- Chemical vapor deposition uses a gas containing a volatile compound of the metal, which gets deposited onto the substrate as a result of a chemical reaction.
- Gilding is a traditional way to attach a gold layer onto metals by applying a very thin sheet of gold held in place by an adhesive.

== See also ==
- Anodizing
- Electrochemical engineering
- Electrogalvanization
- Electropolishing
- Nanolamination
- Electroforming
- Electrowinning
