= Baghdad Battery =

Set of artifacts claimed to be a battery

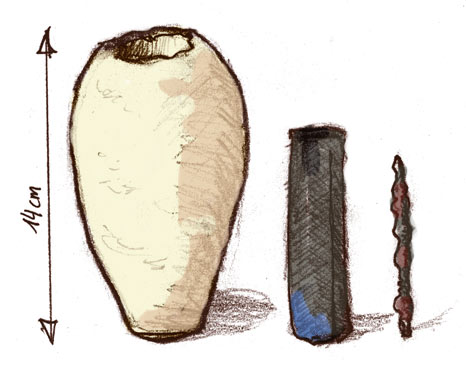
Drawing of the three pieces

The Baghdad Battery or Parthian Battery (Persian: باتری اشکانی; Arabic: بطارية بغداد) are the names given to an artifact consisting of a ceramic pot, a tube of copper, and a rod of iron fixed together with bitumen. It was discovered in present-day Khujut Rabu, Iraq, in 1936, close to the ancient city of Ctesiphon, the capital of the Parthian (150 BC – 223 AD) and Sasanian (224–650 AD) empires, and it is believed to date from either of these periods.

Its origin and purpose remain unclear. Wilhelm König, at the time director of the laboratory of the National Museum of Iraq, suggested that the object functioned as a galvanic cell, possibly used for electroplating, or some kind of electrotherapy. There is no electroplated object known from this period, and the claims are universally rejected by archaeologists. An alternative explanation is that it functioned as a container for magic spells for protection, defense or curses.

Ten similar clay vessels had been found earlier. Four were found in 1930 in Seleucia dating to the Sassanid period. Three were sealed with bitumen and contained a bronze cylinder, again sealed, with a pressed-in papyrus wrapper containing decomposed fiber rolls. They had been held in place with up to four bronze and iron rods sunk into the ground, and their cult meaning and use are inferred. Six other clay vessels were found nearby in Ctesiphon. Some had bronze wrappers with badly decomposed cellulose fibers. Others had iron nails or lead plates.

The current whereabouts of most of the artifacts are unknown, since the 2003 US-led invasion of Iraq. One of the 6 jars found in Ctesiphon is in the collection of the MET in New-York

== Physical description and dating ==
Austrian archaeologist Wilhelm König's description of the find, translated into English, included:

In a vase-like container of bright yellow clay, the neck of which had been removed, a copper cylinder was stuck, held in place by asphalt. The vase was about 15cm high; the cylindrical tube with a closed bottom made from sheet copper had a diameter of 26 mm and a height of 9 cm. In the latter a completely oxidized rod of iron was found, held in place by a sort of stopper of asphalt...

König stated that the cylinder was "fairly pure copper with traces of zinc, lead and iron."

The copper cylinder is not watertight, so if the jar were filled with a liquid, this would surround the iron rod as well. The artifact had been exposed to the weather and had suffered corrosion.

König thought the objects might date to the Parthian period, between 250 BC and AD 224. However, according to St John Simpson of the Near Eastern department of the British Museum, their original excavation and context were not well-recorded, and evidence for this date range is very weak. Furthermore, the style of the pottery is Sasanian (224–640).

Albert Al-Haik noted original reports from the 1936 dig led by Sherif Yousif and Jawad al-Saffar at Khuyut Rabbou'a, giving the location as an area northeast of Baghdad, "some two miles off the Baghdad eastern bund." W. B. Hafford gives context to the discovery of the artifacts in his reaction video to Milo Rossi's video on the subject.

== Comparable finds ==
Similar vessels, which can be distinguished primarily by their contents, had previously been found and examined more closely:

Four clay vessels were excavated at Seleucia in 1930 under the archaeological direction of Leroy Waterman, University of Michigan. All four were common unglazed ceramic, sealed with bitumen stoppers and between 6 and 8 inches (15 to 20cm) tall. Three of these finds were lying horizontal, held in place by up to four metal rods at the ends and sides. The rods were six to ten inches (15 to 25cm) long, one iron rod per jar and the rest bronze. Each contained a bronze cylinder, sealed at both ends, all three the same size: 1¼ inches (3cm) in diameter and 3 inches (7½cm) long. All three cylinders contained plant matter, one decomposed to flakes, one just a small closely-wrapped core and the other appearing to be a papyrus roll folded over at the ends. The fourth jar was found upright and contained fragments of a small broken glass bottle. Silver coins found in context imply a Sasanian date.

In 1931, a German-American excavation expedition led by Ernst Kühnel found six more clay vessels in the immediately neighboring Ctesiphon, including three sealed find objects, each with one, three and ten wrapped and sealed bronze rolls. Inside these bronze wraps were already badly decomposed cellulose fibers. Another clay vessel contained three sealed bronze cylinders. In the other two vessels, which were also sealed, there were plates of originally pure lead coated with lead carbonate in a find specimen; in the other ten heavily corroded iron nails, on which traces of a wrapped organic fiber material could be detected. These finds were also dated to the late Sasanian period.

== Electric battery theory ==
Its origin and purpose remain unclear. Wilhelm König was an assistant at the Iraq Museum in the 1930s. He had observed a number of very fine silver objects from ancient Iraq, plated with very thin layers of gold, and speculated that they were electroplated. In 1938 he authored a paper offering the hypothesis that the Khujut Rabu jar may have formed a galvanic cell, perhaps used for electroplating gold onto silver objects. This interpretation is rejected by archaeologists and scientists.

Two media reports (in 2003 and 2004) stated that corrosion of the metal and tests both indicated that an acidic agent such as wine or vinegar was present in the jar, without giving sources for that information. In 1993, Paul T. Keyser had speculated that "the asphalt seal indicates the presence of liquid" and that because most liquids known at the time were acidic, except for vegetable and mineral oils, that the hypothetical liquid was used as an acidic electrolyte solution to generate an electric current from the difference between the electrode potentials of the copper and iron electrodes.

== Experiments ==
After the publication of a sensationalist article describing the jar in the March 1939 edition of Astounding Science-Fiction, electrical engineer Willard F. M. Gray at the General Electric plant in Pittsfield, Massachusetts made a reconstruction. Gray chose to test it with copper (II) sulphate solution as the electrolyte. He reported that this “worked quite well for a short time.”

Arne Eggebrecht, a past director of the Roemer- und Pelizaeus-Museum Hildesheim, claimed to have electroplated silver onto an unspecified surface. Using many replicas of the jar connected together, with grape juice as the electrolyte, Eggebrecht only produced a layer of silver 100 nanometres thick. Speaking to a reporter for BBC News, Bettina Schmitz, a researcher based at the same museum, said, "There does not exist any written documentation of the experiments which took place here in 1978... The experiments weren't even documented by photos, which really is a pity...I have searched through the archives of this museum and I talked to everyone involved in 1978 with no results."

In 1993, W. Jansen reported an experiment with an electrolyte of diluted acetic acid with some dissolved benzoquinone in a cell and got "good experimental results".

On the 29th episode (23 March 2005) of Discovery Channel program MythBusters, the build team made ten hand-made replica terracotta jars fitted to act as batteries. Lemon juice was chosen as the electrolyte to allow the electrochemical reaction between the copper and iron. With all ten connected in series, the battery produced 4.33 volts of electricity. When linked in series, the ten cells had sufficient power to visibly electroplate a small copper token with zinc when left overnight. Five were sufficient to deliver a painful current through acupuncture type needles stuck in the skin, but ten were not enough to deliver an electric shock to dry skin. Archaeologist Ken Feder commented on the show noting that no archaeological evidence has been found either for connections between the jars (which would have been necessary to produce the required voltage) or for their use for electroplating.

== Problems with the electrical interpretation ==
=== Lack of electrical connections ===
Though the iron rod did project outside of the asphalt plug, the copper tube did not, making it impossible to connect a wire to this to complete a circuit.

=== Expected residues ===
A 2002 article in Plating & Surface Finishing addressed the expected results of the jar being used for electroplating. If used as an electrical cell, copper would have gone into solution in the liquid and copious amounts of copper salts would have been seen in the ceramic vessel and copper metal on the iron parts. This jar was theorised to be the battery but to effect electroplating another cell would be needed. Nothing resembling an electroplating cell with the associated gold or silver traces has been reported.

=== Electroplating hypothesis ===
König himself seems to have been mistaken on the nature of the objects he thought were electroplated. They were apparently fire-gilded (with mercury). Paul Craddock of the British Museum said, "The examples we see from this region and era are conventional gold plating and mercury gilding. There's never been any irrefutable evidence to support the electroplating theory".

König had seen primitive gold electroplating using a ceramic pot being done in Baghdad in 1938. He proposed that the technique could have been passed down through the millennia as a secret of the local jewelers. Gerhard Eggert showed that the method used by the Baghdadi silversmiths in 1938 was almost exactly the same process as that invented in Birmingham, UK in 1839 by John Wright - using a ceramic flowerpot.

David A. Scott, senior scientist at the Getty Conservation Institute and head of its Museum Research Laboratory, writes: "There is a natural tendency for writers dealing with chemical technology to envisage these unique ancient objects of two thousand years ago as electroplating accessories (Foley 1977), but this is clearly untenable, for there is absolutely no evidence for electroplating in this region at the time".

Paul T. Keyser of the University of Alberta noted that using only vinegar, or other electrolytes available at the time the jar was made, the battery would be very feeble. For that and other reasons, Keyser concluded that even if this was in fact a battery, it could not have been used for electroplating. However, Keyser still supported the battery theory, but believed it was used for some kind of mild electrotherapy such as pain relief, possibly through electroacupuncture.

=== Bitumen as an insulator ===
A bitumen seal, being thermoplastic, would be extremely inconvenient for a galvanic cell, which would require frequent topping up of the electrolyte for extended use.

=== Oxygen needed to function ===
Tests run by Emmerich Paszthory showed that oxygen was a limiting factor for the cell to function when the electrolyte was water with salt and acetic or citric acids. Sealing the copper cylinders in the way seen in the archaeological finds brought electricity production to a stop at once.

=== Iron shape ===
Emmerich Paszthory found that when used as an electrode an iron rod erodes at the neck, so the tapered shape of the iron nail showed it had not been used as an electrode.

=== Alternative hypothesis ===
Wilhelm König noted the clear similarity of this jar with the 4 found in Seleucia and 6 found in Ctesiphon. In 1932, Kühnel described those found at Ctesiphon as containers for "conjurations, blessings and the like, written perhaps on papyrus". Emmerich Paszthory asserted the Khujut Rabu jar and those from Seleucia and Ctesiphon were clearly magic objects - as all the parts were known to be associated with magic in that time. As the tubes were copper, the spell was probably protective. "Magic nails have been preserved in large numbers." The iron nails were used to nail fast the contents. Brad Hafford of the University of Pennsylvania and Penn Museum agreed with this analysis. The jars found in Seleucia were in the same vicinity as three magical or incantation bowls - made to protect against demons. Two of those bowls were covered with fake writing. Those two were found stacked together, covering a similarly inscribed eggshell. The jar found at Khujut Rabu' (the Baghdad Battery) was itself also found in association with magical bowls.

The artifacts are similar to other objects believed to be storage vessels for sacred scrolls from nearby Seleucia on the Tigris.

In March 2012, Professor Elizabeth Stone of Stony Brook University, an expert on Iraqi archaeology, returning from the first archaeological expedition in Iraq after 20 years, stated that she does not know a single archaeologist who believed that these were batteries.

== See also ==
- Coso artifact – Spark plug supposedly encased in a 500,000-year-old geode
- Dendera light – Motif in the Hathor temple in Egypt
- History of the battery
- Leyden jar – Antique electrical device that stores a high-voltage electric charge
- List of topics characterized as pseudoscience
- Out-of-place artifact – Artifacts purported to challenge historical chronology
