= Liquid junction interface =

In mass spectrometry, liquid junction interface is an ion source or set-up that couples peripheric devices, such as capillary electrophoresis, to mass spectrometry.

See the IUPAC recommendation definition as a means of coupling capillary electrophoresis to mass spectrometry in which a liquid reservoir surrounds the separation capillary and transfer capillary to the mass spectrometer. The reservoir provides electrical contact for the capillary electrophoresis.

The term liquid junction interface has also been used by Henry M. Fales and coworkers for ion sources where the analyte is in direct contact with the high voltage supply. This includes in particular nanospray ion sources where a wire made of stainless steel, gold or other conducting material makes contact with the sample solution inside uncoated spray capillaries. The principle is also applied when a stainless steel union connects a chromatography outlet to a spray capillary. Its use has a number of advantages with respect to simplification of interface or source design, easy handling and cost. Electrolysis effects have to be controlled.

Liquid junction interfaces have been used for on-line desalting in conjunction with mass spectrometry. Thereby, chromatographic material such as C18 phase was directly placed in the flow path coming from a pump or an HPLC device. In a variation of the method, fine capillaries were densely packed with chromatographic phase to form separation columns and act as electrospray capillaries at the same time. This method is commonly employed in many proteomics laboratories.

It is of note that experimental designs where the direct application of high voltages to liquids to form aerosols and sprays has been described as early as 1917 in the context of not ionization, but atomization of liquids.

== See also ==
Liquid junction potential - the process which occurs when two solutions of different concentrations are in contact with each other
