= Wilhelm König =

Austrian archaeologist and painter

Wilhelm König (born in Vienna) was an Austrian archaeologist and painter.

A painter by profession, in 1931, König was elected assistant to the German leader of the Baghdad Antiquity Administration with the title of a "Direktor". At the excavation of a Parthian settlement in modern day Khujut Rabu (near Baghdad, Iraq), he discovered the alleged Baghdad Battery. In February 1939, he returned to Vienna, due to blood poisoning, where he published a book Im verlorenen Paradies. Neun Jahre Irak.

== Controversy ==
In March 2012, Professor Elizabeth Stone, of Stony Brook University, an expert on Iraqi archaeology, returning from one of the first archaeological expeditions in Iraq since 20 years, stated that she does not know a single archaeologist, who believed that this was a "real battery".

== Works ==
- Neun Jahre Irak Brünn, Münster, Wien 1940

== Work ==
=== Plaster castings ===
The plaster castings of objects from the Iraq museum, which are exhibited in the "Vorderasiatisches Museum" in Berlin, were made by König.

=== Publications ===
- Ein galvanisches Element aus der Partherzeit? In: Forschungen und Fortschritte^{(de)}. Band 14, 1936, S. 8–9.
- Im verlorenen Paradies. Neun Jahre Irak. Rohrer, Baden bei Wien u. a. 1940 (Buchbesprechung von Käte Fück: König: Im verlorenen Paradies. Neun Jahre Irak. In: Zeitschrift der Deutschen Morgenländischen Gesellschaft. Band 95 [Neue Folge Band 20], Nr. 3/4, 1941, S. 441 f. [Digitalisat]).

== Literature ==
- Arnold Nöldeke^{(de)}: Briefe aus Uruk-Warka, 1931–1939. Hrsg. von Margarete van Ess^{(de)} und Elisabeth Weber-Nöldeke. Reichert, Wiesbaden 2008, ISBN 978-3-89500-485-8, S. 331.
- Erich Zehren: Die biblischen Hügel: zur Geschichte der Archäeologie.Hrsg. von F. A. Herbig^{(de)}, 1961, S. 88, 124, 157, u.v.m. (Google Books)
