= Slip-critical joint =

Slip-critical joint, from structural engineering, is a type of bolted structural steel connection which relies on friction between the two connected elements rather than bolt shear or bolt bearing to join two structural elements.

Shear (and tension) loads can be transferred between two structural elements by either a bearing-type connection or a slip-critical connection.

In a slip-critical connection, loads are transferred from one element to another through friction forces developed between the faying surfaces of the connection. These friction forces are generated by the extreme tightness of the structural bolts holding the connection together. These bolts, usually tension control bolts or compressible washer tension indicating type bolts, are tensioned to a minimum required amount to generate large enough friction forces between the faying surfaces such that the shear (or tension) load is transferred by the structural members and not by the bolts (in shear) and the connection plates (in bearing). The "turn of the nut" method is also widely used to achieve that state of friction.

If slip-critical connections fail (by slipping), they revert to bearing-type connections, with structural forces now transferred through bolt shear and connection plate bearing. Thus a slippage failure of a slip-critical connection is not necessarily a catastrophic failure. However, slippage of a slip-critical connection in columns may lead to column instability. Slippage of a slip critical joint in a roof truss could result in unintended ponding effects.

The faying surfaces of slip-critical connections must be properly prepared in order to maximize friction forces between the surfaces joined. Usually, this requires cleaning, descaling, roughening, and/or blasting of the faying surfaces. Painting the faying surfaces with a class B primer also allows being in accordance with most of the design that asks for Slip-critical joint.
