= George Richards Elkington =

British businessman

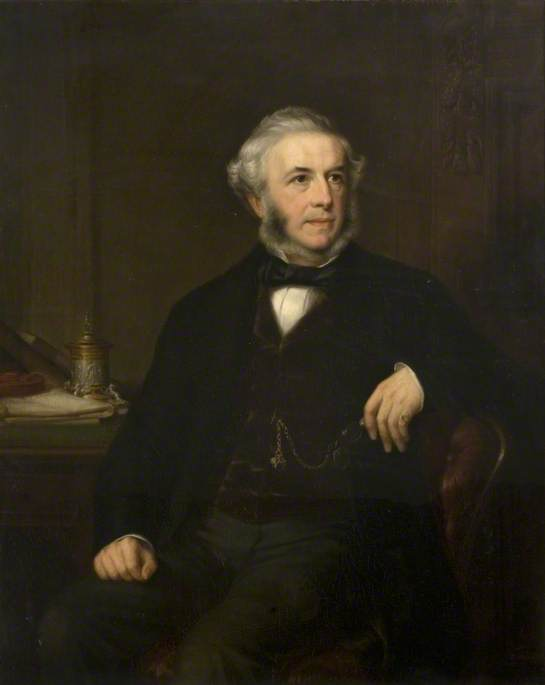
George Richards Elkington (1801–1865) by Samuel West

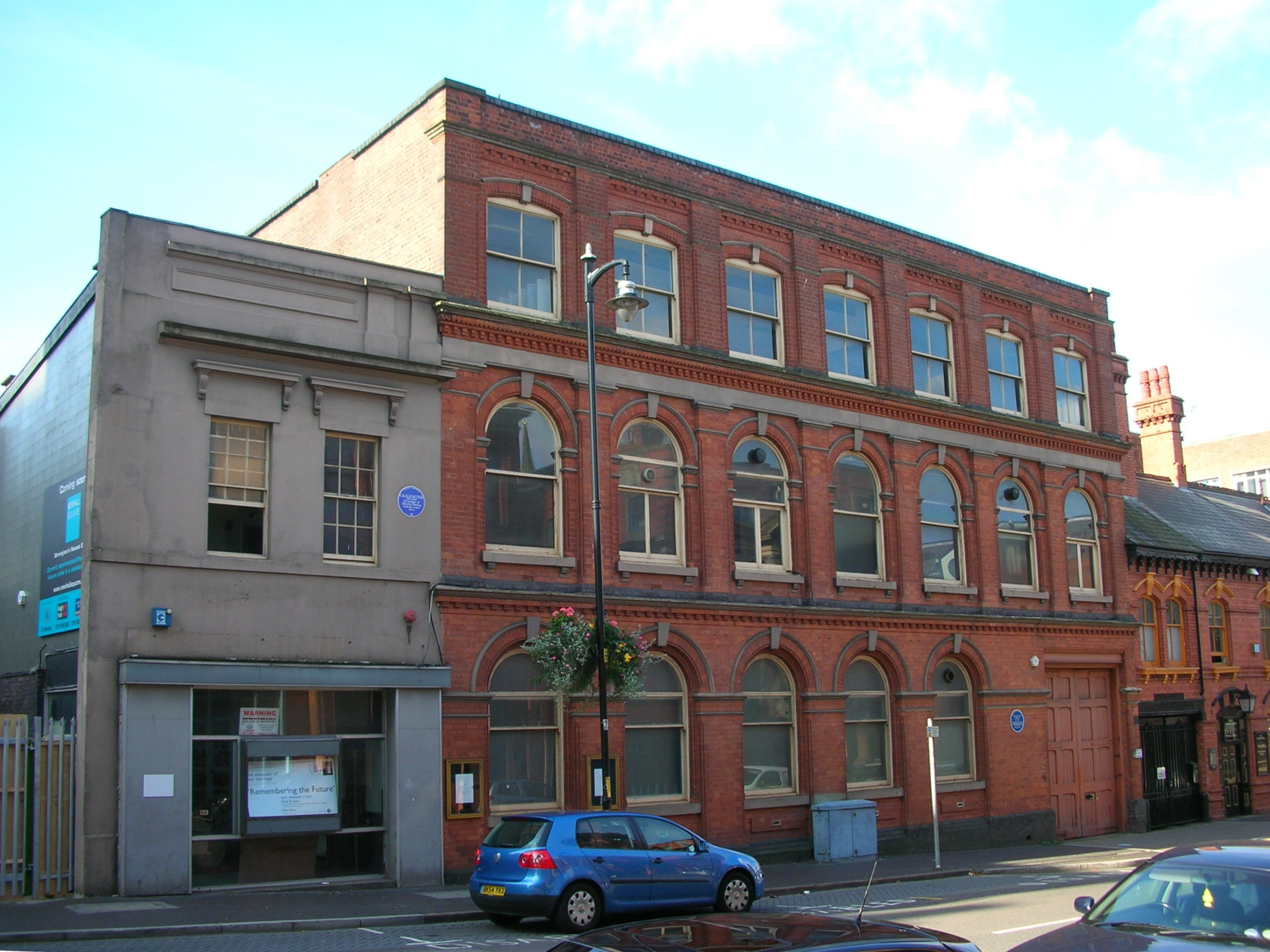
The old Elkington Silver Electroplating Works in Birmingham

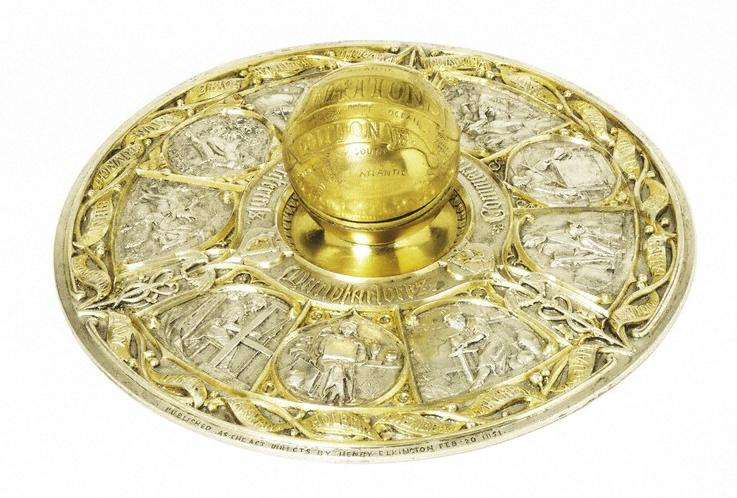
Commemorative inkstand, about 1850, Elkington & Co. V&A Museum no. 481&A-1901

George Richards Elkington (17 October 1801 – 22 September 1865) was a manufacturer from Birmingham, England. He patented the first commercial electroplating process.

== Biography ==
Elkington was born in Birmingham, the son of a spectacle manufacturer. Apprenticed to his uncles' silver plating business in 1815, he became, on their death, sole proprietor of the business, but subsequently took his cousin, Henry Elkington, into partnership. The science of electrometallurgy was then in its infancy, but the Elkingtons were quick to recognize its possibilities. They had already taken out certain patents for the application of electricity to metals when, in 1840, John Wright, a Birmingham surgeon, discovered the valuable properties of a solution of cyanide of silver in potassium cyanide for electroplating purposes. The Elkingtons purchased and patented Wright's process (British Patent 8447 : Improvements in Coating, Covering, or Plating certain Metals), subsequently acquiring the rights of other processes and improvements. In 1843 Elkingtons acquired the rights to Werner von Siemens's first invention, an improvement to the gold and silver plating process.

The Elkingtons opened a new electroplating works in Newhall Street, in the Jewellery Quarter, Birmingham in 1841, and the following year Josiah Mason, a pen manufacturer, joined the firm and encouraged the Elkingtons to diversify their output, adding more affordable electroplated jewellery and cutlery to the large pieces the company had been producing. Electroplated wares became very successful in the Victorian market and by 1880 the company employed 1,000 people at the Newhall Street site and had a further six factories. The agreement between Elkington and Mason was dissolved on 31 December 1861, after which the company traded as Elkington and Co.

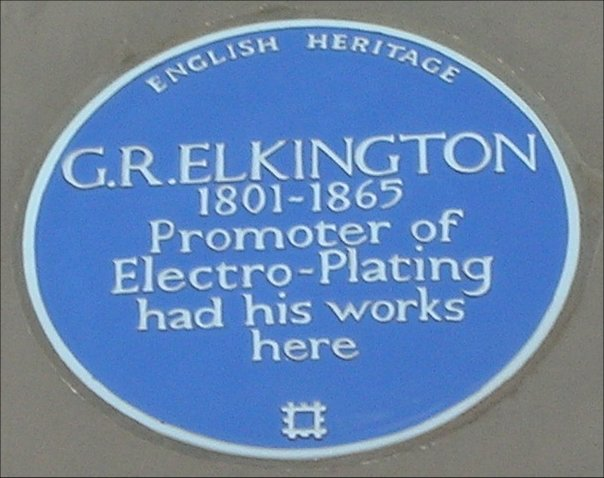
Blue plaque on the old Elkington Silver Electroplating Works

There is a Blue Plaque commemorating him on the old Elkington Silver Electroplating Works, Newhall Street, Birmingham.

== Family ==
He married Mary Auster Balleney in 1825 and had seven surviving children, Frederick, George, James, Alfred, Howard, Hyla and one girl, Emma. Mary Auster died in 1858 and was buried in St. Mary's churchyard, Selly Oak, Birmingham and in 1860 he married secondly Margaret Morgan Jones.

On his death in 1865 he left £350,000 and his business to be continued by four of his sons, Frederick, James, Alfred and Howard.

Stained-glass windows were erected in St. Mary's Church, Selly Oak in memory of both wives and of him. George had made a substantial contribution towards the construction of this church.

His grandfather was the land drainage reformer Joseph Elkington.
