= Woolrich Electrical Generator =

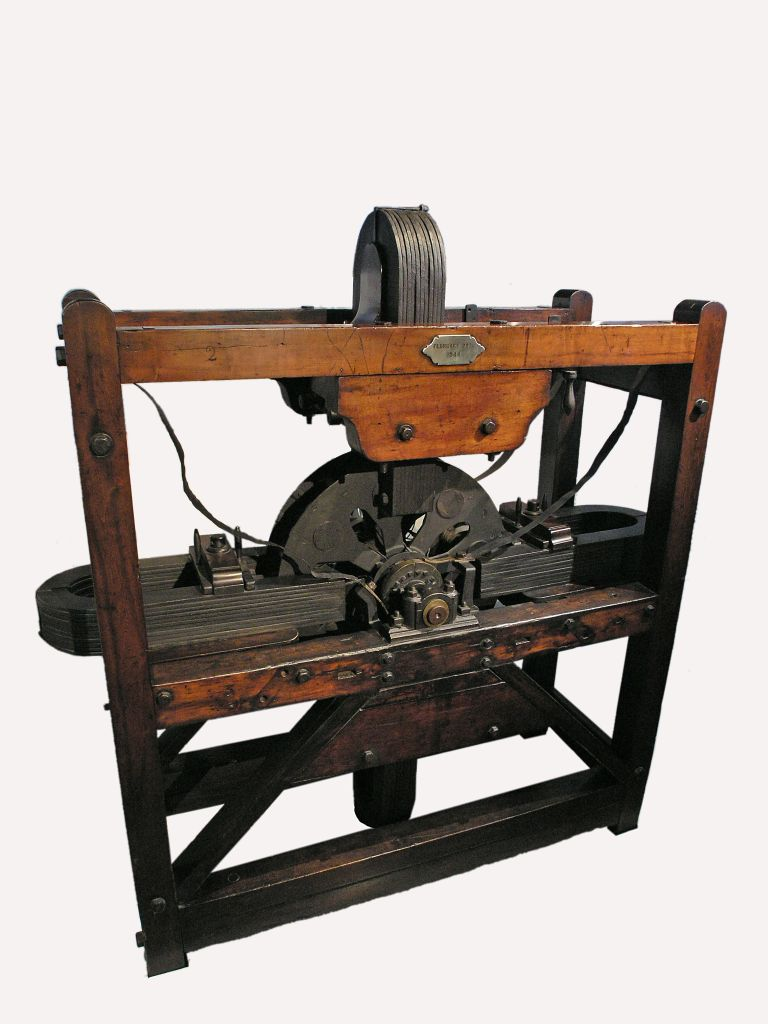
- The electrical generator at Thinktank

Origins
- Designer: John Stephen Woolrich
- Maker: Thomas Prime and Son
- Date: February 1844; 181 years ago
- Country of origin: England

Measurements

Preservation
- Collection: Birmingham Museums Trust
- Location: Thinktank, Digbeth, Birmingham, England
- Accession no.: 1889S00044

The Woolrich Electrical Generator, now in Thinktank, Birmingham Science Museum, England, is the earliest electrical generator used in an industrial process. Built in February 1844 at the Magneto Works of Thomas Prime and Son, Birmingham, to a design by John Stephen Woolrich (1820–1850), it was used by the firm of Elkingtons for commercial electroplating.

== Plaque ==
The generator stood for some time in the chapel of Aston Hall, accompanied by a plaque bearing the following inscription:

This machine, founded upon Faraday's great discovery of Induction, was invented by the late John Stephen Woolrich of Birmingham. It was constructed by Messrs. Prime & Son in 1844, and was worked by them for many years, until superseded by machines of improved construction and greater power. It is the FIRST magnetic machine that ever deposited silver, gold or copper, and it is the forerunner of all the magnificent dynamo machines that have since been invented. Professor Faraday, on the occasion of the meeting of the British Association in Birmingham, paid a visit, together with some of his scientific friends, to Messrs. Prime & Son's Works, purposely to see the application of this great discovery in practical operation, and expressed his intense delight at witnessing his discovery so early and extensively applied and so successfully carried into practical use. To Birmingham belongs the honour not only of introducing electro-plate, the use of which has been extended to every civilised nation, but also the honour of first adopting Faraday's great discovery of obtaining electricity from magnetism, — a discovery that has influenced science and art to an enormous extent.

== Construction ==
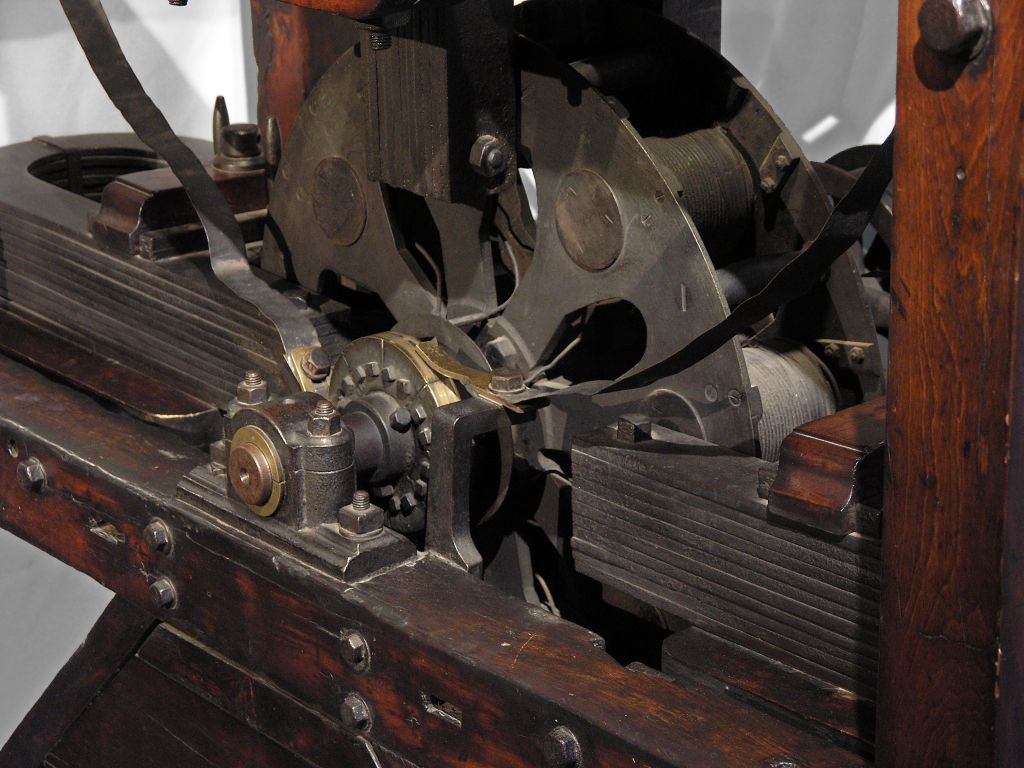
Commutator with output wires.

The generator in its surviving form consists of eight axial bobbins with a magnetic field applied by four iron horseshoe magnets. The rectangular, wood frame measures 5 feet 4 inches (1.63 m) tall, 6 feet (1.8 m) wide, and 2 feet (61 cm) long. The generator was fitted with a commutator, as electroplating requires direct current.

== John Stephen Woolrich ==
The generator's designer, John Stephen Woolrich, was born in Lichfield, England in late 1820. The second son of John Woolrich (c.1791–1843) and his wife Mary Woolrich (formerly Egginton), he was baptised at St Mary's Church, Lichfield on 6 November 1820.

In August 1842 he was granted patent number 9431 for the use of a magneto-electrical machine (instead of batteries) in electroplating, and the use of gold sulphite and silver sulphite as electrolytes. He offered to sell the rights to Elkingtons for the enormous sum of £15,000; they declined, and after some heated correspondence eventually, in May 1845, agreed to pay Woolrich £100 initially and then £400 annually for the rest of the term of the patent. Woolrich later relicensed the patent himself to use in his own Magneto-Plating and Gilding Works in Great Charles Street, Birmingham, and in 1849 was listed as a "chemist & magneto-plater & gilder", residing at 12 James Street, just off St Paul's Square in the Jewellery Quarter.

He died at the age of 29 in early 1850, and was buried at St Bartholomew's Church, Edgbaston on 4 March 1850.

The elder John Woolrich is listed in the United Kingdom Census 1841 as a "Chemist", and at the time of his death on 20 April 1843 was a lecturer in chemistry at the Royal School of Medicine and Surgery in Birmingham. He had a particular interest in electrochemistry, and in February 1819 wrote a letter entitled On Galvanic Shocks to the Annals of Philosophy, pointing out an error in the editor Thomas Thomson's book System of Chemistry. He was granted a number of patents for chemical processes, including one in 1836 for an improved method of producing "carbonate of baryta" (barium carbonate) and another in 1839 for producing "carbonate of lead, commonly called white lead".

== See also ==
- Dynamo
- Electromagnetic induction
- Faraday's law of induction
