= Elkington Silver Electroplating Works =

Building in Birmingham, England

Coordinates: 52°29′0.92″N 1°54′22.79″W

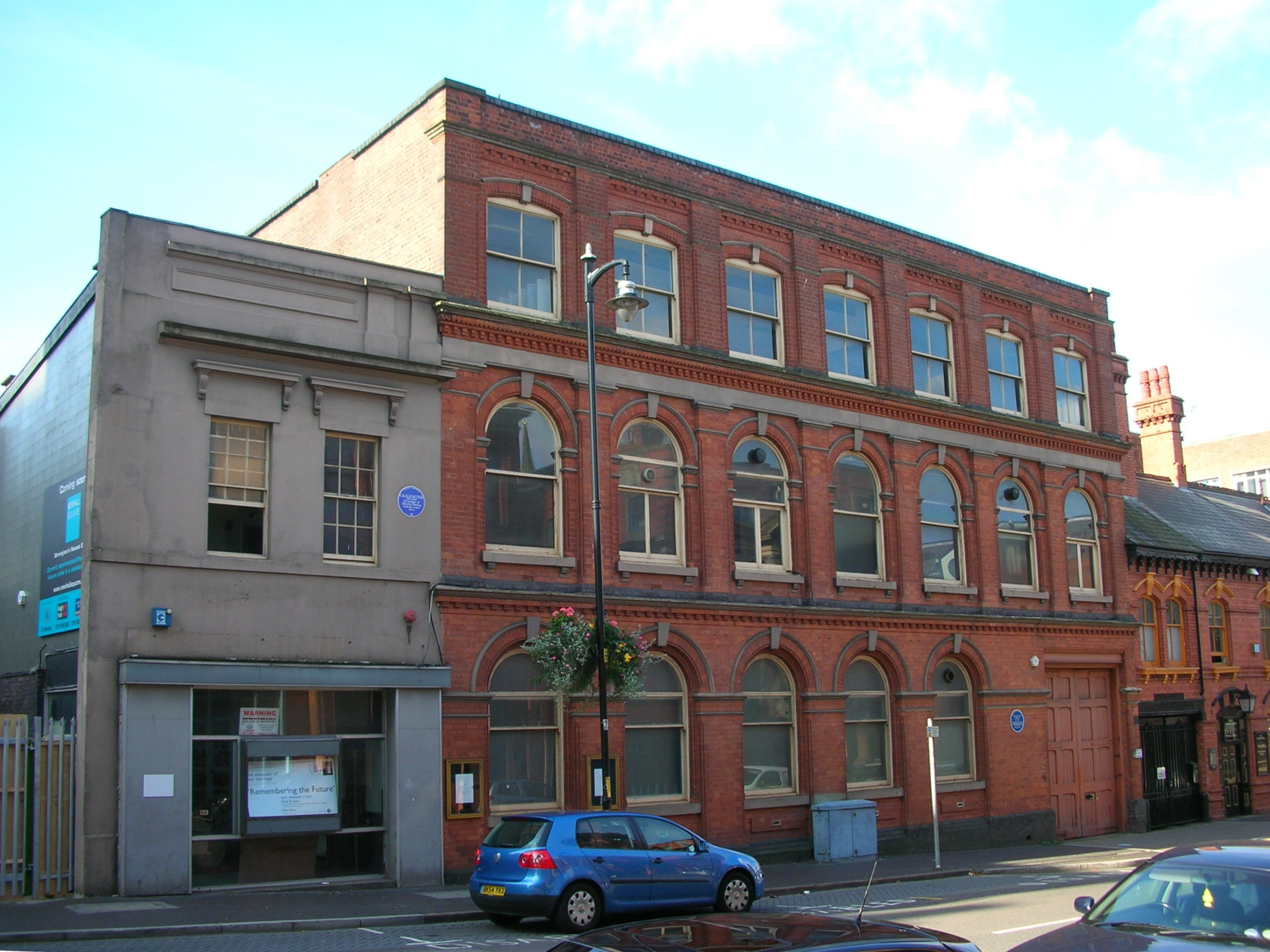
The building in 2006

The Elkington Silver Electroplating Works was a building on Newhall Street in Birmingham, England. It later housed the Birmingham science museum Museum of Science and Industry until the creation of Thinktank.

Standing opposite the Birmingham Assay Office, the original 19th century silver electroplating factory of George Elkington, built in 1838, once occupied a much longer, grandiose building on Newhall Street which was largely demolished in the mid-1960s. The works had many workshops and warehouses along and over the Birmingham and Fazeley Canal and the now filled-in Whitmore's Arm (or Miss Colmore's Arm) canal, which ran through the site. In the early 1850s there was a steam-powered electric generator with 64 permanent magnets arranged in a circle and a rotating wrought iron armature. The electroplating process involved solutions of cyanide of silver and potassium cyanide.

The building carries two blue plaques on its wall, one to George Elkington, and another to his employee Alexander Parkes who is credited with inventing the first plastic.

== Museum of Science and Industry ==
The site hosted the science museum of Birmingham Museum & Art Gallery from 1951 until its closure in 1997. Many exhibits were then moved to Thinktank, which later opened as an entrance-fee-based exhibition in Millennium Point in Eastside, in September 2001. Among the famous exhibits to move in the relocation was the 1797 Smethwick Engine, produced by famous local industrialist James Watt. It had originally been located in the town of Smethwick, before being relocated to the Birmingham Canal Navigation Workshops at Ocker Hill (Note: This gave the engine its alternative name of the 'Ocker Hill Engine') (actually some 10 miles away to a town named Tipton) in 1897. However, it came to the museum in 1959 on the closure of the workshops. Also moved to the new museum was Elkington's own Woolrich Electrical Generator, made in 1844, the earliest electrical generator used in an industrial process.

== Future development ==
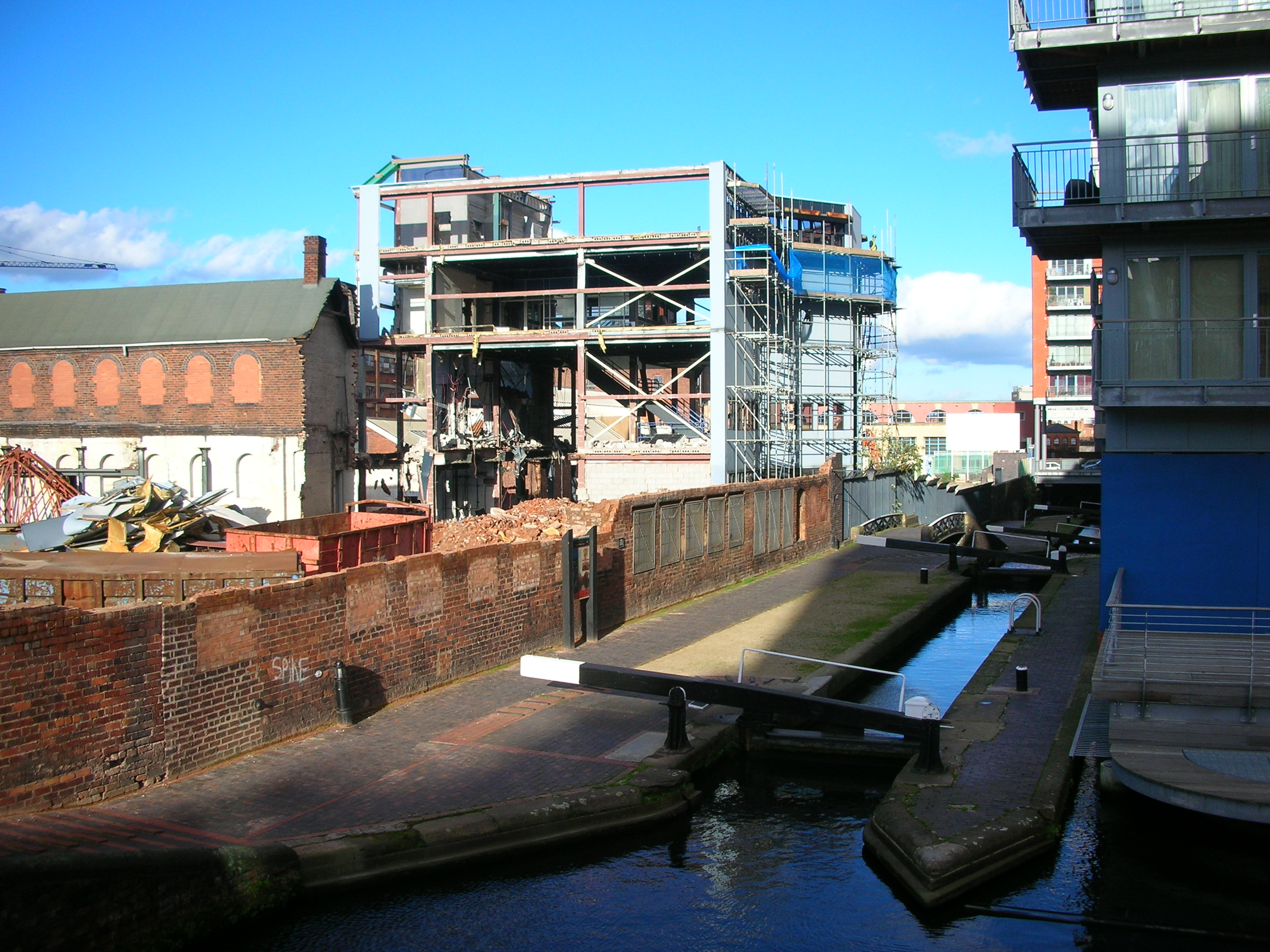
Demolition of the buildings not fronting Newhall Street, in October 2006

Birmingham City Council put up the site, which runs along Newhall Street and Charlotte Street, and adjoins the Birmingham and Fazeley Canal, for long lease and redevelopment. The development was awarded to St Bernard's Property in 2002.

Planning permission was granted in 2006 for the Jewellery Box – a mixed use leisure, commercial and residential development with 234 apartments. This was under construction in 2008, and further apartments were added over the car park in 2019.

The grade II listed ornate terracotta Queen's Arms pub adjoins the site, which is within the Jewellery Quarter Conservation Area.

== See also ==
- Science and invention in Birmingham

== Sources ==
- The Birmingham Jewellery Quarter – An Architectural Survey of the Manufactories, John Cattell, Sheila Ely, Barry Jones, English Heritage, 2002, ISBN 1-873592-48-5
- Birmingham City Council on the former Science Museum
- BCC Redevelopment Brief 2002, PDF 983Kb
