= Hull cell =

Measuring instrument used in electroplating

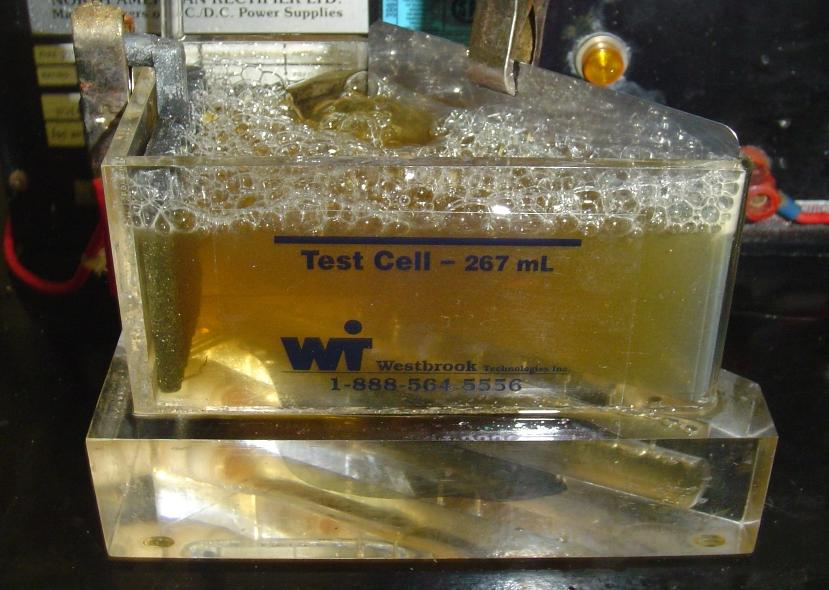
A Zinc solution tested in a Hull Cell

The Hull cell is a type of test cell used to qualitatively check the condition of a electroplating bath. It allows for optimization for current density range, optimization of additive concentration, recognition of impurity effects and indication of macro-throwing power capability. The Hull cell replicates the plating bath on a lab scale. It is filled with a sample of the plating solution, an appropriate anode which is connected to a rectifier. The "work" is replaced with a hull cell test panel that will be plated to show the "health" of the bath.

The Hull cell is a trapezoidal container that holds 267 ml of solution. This shapes allows to place the test panel on an angle to the anode. As a result the deposit is plated at different current densities which can be measure with a hull cell ruler. The solution volume allows for a quantitative optimization of additive concentration: 1 gram addition to 267 mL is equivalent to 0.5 oz/gal in the plating tank.
