= Henry M. Fales =

- Born: February 12, 1927; New York City, United States
- Died: October 28, 2010 (aged 82); Silver Spring, Maryland, United States
- Education: Rutgers University
- Known for: natural substances identification, bioanalytical chromatography and mass spectrometry
- Scientific career
- Fields: Chemistry
- Workplaces: National Institutes of Health
- Doctoral advisor: Roderick Barnes

Henry M. Fales (February 12, 1927, New York, NY – October 28, 2010, Silver Spring, MD) was an American organic chemist and mass spectrometrist. He authored and co-authored over 350 scientific publications on natural substances and biochemistry.

== Academic career ==
Fales obtained his PhD from Rutgers University. He worked at the National Heart, Lung, and Blood Institute of the National Institutes of Health in Bethesda, Maryland, since 1954, first as Chief of the Laboratory of Biophysical Chemistry and later as Chief of the Laboratory of Applied Mass Spectrometry. Under his direction, the Laboratory of Chemistry in NHLBI became a world-renowned center for structural chemistry during the 1960s, integrating nmr, x-ray crystallography and mass spectrometry. Fales and coworkers also began a reference library of molecular weights which was incorporated into the Merck Index.

He served on the editorial boards for the Journal of Mass Spectrometry, the Journal of the American Society for Mass Spectrometry, Analytical Chemistry and Bioanalytical Chemistry. He served on the advisory panel on Chemistry of the National Science Foundation. H. M. Fales held several functions in the board of directors of the American Society for Mass Spectrometry including president.

== Awards ==
Fales received several awards including Chromatographer of the Year of the Washington Chromatography Discussion Group (1973), DHEW Superior Service Awards (1973, 1986), the Hillebrand Prize from the Chemical Society of Washington in 1977, and a Professional Service Award of Alpha Chi Sigma, Washington, D.C. (1988).

== See also ==
- Liquid junction interface
