= Liquid junction potential =

Phenomenon in chemistry involving solutions of electrolytes

Liquid junction potential (shortly LJP) occurs when two solutions of electrolytes of different concentrations (e.g. 1.0 M HCl and 0.1 M HCl) are in contact with each other. The more concentrated solution will have a tendency to diffuse into the comparatively less concentrated one. Furthermore, the diffusion fluxes of the anion and the cation in an ionic compound are usually not equal. In the preceding example H^{+} ions, due to their higher electrical mobility (or alternatively, their higher diffusion coefficient), will move faster than the Cl^{-} ions. In this case the dilute solution will acquire a positive charge on its side of the liquid junction (because H+ cations diffuse faster than Cl- anions), while the concentrated solution will become negatively charged. This charge separation creates an electric field at the liquid junction, and this field contributes to the potential difference between reference electrodes immersed in the two solutions. It is worth noting, that the electric field at the liquid junction counters the mass-transport of the ions by diffusion. At a certain time a steady-state liquid junction potential can develop.

Liquid junction potential also develops between two solutions of different compositions, even if their concentrations are the same. This is also because the diffusion coefficients of the different ions are not the same, in general.

This additional liquid junction potential (also known as diffusion potential) is a non-equilibrium potential (and, thus, cannot be calculated thermodynamically), but it can achieve a steady-state, where the speed of ion migration in the electric field balances the speed of ions' diffusion. However, its value - a steady-state yet non-equilibrium- may depend on the geometry of the liquid junction.

The diffusion potential is small in solutions, when the cation and anion mobilities (or, equivalently their diffusion coefficients) are similar. This is also equivalent to saying, that in such solutions the ion transport numbers for anions and cations are the same.

The two most often used salts with near-similar diffusion coefficients of cation and anion are: KCl and NaNO_{3}.

== Calculation ==
Absolute values for the liquid junction potential cannot be measured directly but they can be calculated in principle. Changes in the liquid junction potential, in contrast, can be determined experimentally. The electromotive force (EMF) of a concentration cell with transference includes the liquid junction potential.

The EMF of a concentration cell without transport is:

$$E_\mathrm{nt} = \frac{RT}{F} \ln \frac{a_2}{a_1}$$

where $a_1$ and $a_2$ are activities of HCl in the two solutions, $R$ is the universal gas constant, $T$ is the temperature and $F$ is the Faraday constant.

The EMF of a concentration cell with transport (including the ion transport number) is:

$$E_\mathrm{wt} = 2t_M\frac{RT}{F} \ln \frac{a_2}{a_1}$$

where $a_2$ and $a_1$ are activities of HCl solutions of right and left hand electrodes, respectively, and $t_M$ is the transport number of Cl^{−}.

Liquid junction potential is the difference between the two EMFs of the two concentration cells, with and without ionic transport:

$$E_\mathrm{lj} = E_\mathrm{wt} - E_\mathrm{nt} = (2t_M - 1)\frac{RT}{F} \ln \frac{a_2}{a_1}$$

== Minimization of liquid junction potentials ==
The liquid junction potential interferes with the exact measurement of the electromotive force of a chemical cell, so its effect should be minimized as much as possible for accurate measurement.

As stated earlier, the magnitude of the liquid junction potential depends on the relative speeds of the moving ions. K^{+} cations and Cl^{-} anions have similar values of diffusion coefficients in many solvents. For this reason KCl solutions are often used in salt bridges to minimize the liquid junction potential.

Ammonium nitrate (NH_{4}NO_{3}) solutions have also been used in salt bridges, particularly when the system under investigation cannot tolerate chloride ions.

The most common practical method of eliminating the liquid junction potential is to place a salt bridge consisting of a saturated solution of potassium chloride (KCl) or ammonium nitrate (NH_{4}NO_{3}) between the two solutions constituting the junction. When such a bridge is used, the ions in the bridge are present in large excess at the junction and they carry almost all the charges, that are responsible for the development of a liquid junction potential across the boundary. Furthermore, in the most common design of a salt bridge the liquid junction potentials between the bridge and the two connected solutions subtract from each other, thus further minimizing the non-thermodynamic contributions to the measured voltage.

== See also ==
- Concentration cell
- Ion transport number
- ITIES
- Electrochemical kinetics
