= Khujut Rabu =

Khujut Rabu' (Arabic: خوجوت رابه) is a local area to the South-East of Baghdad, Iraq, near the town of the present-day Salman Pak. Also Khujut Rabua. Until 637 AD, this was the location of Ctesiphon and Seleucia on the Tigris. This area was the capital city of Iran, also known as Persia, and by the Romans as Ariana; during the Selucid, Parthian and Sasanian dynasties. Modern excavations of these two ancient cities have provided many artifacts from ancient times, including the alleged Baghdad Battery. Modern tourists can still visit Taq Kasra (the Arch of Ctesiphon).
