= John Wright (inventor) =

John Wright (1808–1844) was an English surgeon from Birmingham, England who invented a process of electroplating involving potassium cyanide. The process was patented in 1840 by Wright's associate George Richards Elkington.

He was born on the Isle of Sheppey, Kent and was apprenticed to a Dr Spearman in Rotherham, Yorkshire. He then completed his medical training in Edinburgh, Paris and London.

He moved to the Bordesley district of Birmingham in 1833, in the centre of the metal working industry, where he experimented with electricity in his spare time. After reading an article by Carl Wilhelm Scheele on the behaviour of the cyanides of gold and silver in a solution of potassium cyanide he devised an experiment to test such a solution as an electrolyte. The results were promising with a good coating of gold or silver being achievable. He contacted the plating firm of Elkingtons who paid him £300 for the rights to patent the procedure plus a further £500 when the patent (British Patent 8447) was approved in 1840. The process became widely used in preference to the dangerous techniques previously used and Wright benefited from a steady royalty income.

He died in 1844 at a young age from the effects of falling from his carriage.
