= Electrochemical potential =

Intensive physical property of substances

In electrochemistry, the electrochemical potential (ECP), μ̅, is a thermodynamic measure of chemical potential that does not omit the energy contribution of electrostatics. Electrochemical potential is expressed in the unit of J/mol.

== Introduction ==
Each chemical species (for example, "water molecules", "sodium ions", "electrons", etc.) has an electrochemical potential (a quantity with units of energy) at any given point in space, which represents how easy or difficult it is to add more of that species to that location. If possible, a species will move from areas with higher electrochemical potential to areas with lower electrochemical potential; in equilibrium, the electrochemical potential will be constant everywhere for each species (it may have a different value for different species). For example, if a glass of water has sodium ions (Na^{+}) dissolved uniformly in it, and an electric field is applied across the water, then the sodium ions will tend to get pulled by the electric field towards one side. We say the ions have electric potential energy, and are moving to lower their potential energy. Likewise, if a glass of water has a lot of dissolved sugar on one side and none on the other side, each sugar molecule will randomly diffuse around the water, until there is equal concentration of sugar everywhere. We say that the sugar molecules have a "chemical potential", which is higher in the high-concentration areas, and the molecules move to lower their chemical potential. These two examples show that an electrical potential and a chemical potential can both give the same result: A redistribution of the chemical species. Therefore, it makes sense to combine them into a single "potential", the electrochemical potential, which can directly give the net redistribution taking both into account.

It is (in principle) easy to measure whether or not two regions (for example, two glasses of water) have the same electrochemical potential for a certain chemical species (for example, a solute molecule): Allow the species to freely move back and forth between the two regions (for example, connect them with a semi-permeable membrane that lets only that species through). If the electrochemical potential is the same in the two regions, the species will occasionally move back and forth between the two regions, but on average there is just as much movement in one direction as the other, and there is zero net migration (this is called "diffusive equilibrium"). If the electrochemical potentials of the two regions are different, more molecules will move to the lower electrochemical potential than the other direction.

Moreover, when there is not diffusive equilibrium, i.e., when there is a tendency for molecules to diffuse from one region to another, then there is a certain free energy released by each net-diffusing molecule. This energy, which can sometimes be harnessed (a simple example is a concentration cell), and the free-energy per mole is exactly equal to the electrochemical potential difference between the two regions.

== Thermodynamic definition ==
Formally, the electrochemical potential $\bar \mu_i$ for species $i$ is defined the same way as the chemical potential, as the partial molar Gibbs free energy:

$$\bar\mu_i = \left(\frac{\partial G}{\partial N_i} \right)_{T,P, N_{j \ne i}},$$

where $G$ is the total Gibbs free energy that does not neglect electrostatic energy.

The above definition is somewhat delicate: when charged species are added to a thermodynamic body, they alter its total charge. The excess charge does not spread homogeneously throughout the body, but instead interacts with itself at long distances and tends to accumulate at surfaces while the interiors of bodies remain charge-neutral. The total $G$ that permits charge imbalance is therefore necessarily inhomogeneous, containing electrostatic surface effects that do not scale proportional to the volume of the system, and are sensitive to the electric environment around the body.

The bulk interior of an electrochemical fluid meanwhile remains charge neutral and homogeneous. Since the interior is charge neutral, it is not possible to vary the interior numbers of ions independently of each other. The constraint on the interior $N_i$s is:

$$\sum N_i z_i = 0,$$

where $z_i$ is the ionic charge (−2, +1, etc.) for the species $i$. A charge-neutral Gibbs free energy can be defined for the interior, and it will be insensitive to the electrostatic offset. But, due to the charge-neutrality constraint on the $N_i$, it is also insufficient for defining any one ion's $\bar \mu_i$ using the formal definition above. The charge-neutral $G$ however does define all charge-neutral combinations of chemical potentials, such as $\bar\mu_{\mathrm H^+} + \bar\mu_{\mathrm{Cl}^-}$. In this manner, the electrochemical potentials of all the ions are determined in relation to each other, though they all have an undetermined electrostatic offset. Once any ion's $\bar \mu_i$ is fixed, the rest are fixed as well (for a given composition, temperature, and pressure).

== Uses ==
Differences in electrochemical potential are measurable and physically meaningful:

- If two bodies have equal temperatures but differ in electrochemical potential of some species, then that species will spontaneously move from higher to lower electrochemical potential if able.
- At equilibrium, electrochemical potentials for each species will equalize throughout the domain that it can travel. For example, the $\bar \mu$ of any ion will equalize across a semi-permeable membrane that permits that ion to pass through, while impassable ions will not equalize their $\bar \mu$.
- Two disconnected bodies of exactly identical compositions may have a difference $\Delta \phi$ in electrostatic potential. The electrochemical potential differences $\Delta\bar\mu_i$ between the two bodies is then given by:

$$\Delta\bar\mu_i = z_i F \Delta \phi.$$

- Equilibrium chemical reactions are expressible as an equality (zero difference) in electrochemical potentials, e.g. the hydrogen electrode reaction $\ce{2H_{(aq)}+ + 2e- <=> H2_{(g)}}$ requires at equilibrium that $2\bar\mu_{\mathrm H^+} + 2\bar\mu_{\mathrm e^-} = \bar\mu_{\mathrm H_2}$.
- Differences in the electron electrochemical potential $\bar\mu_{\mathrm e^-}$ are precisely what is measured by DC voltmeters. The electron electrochemical potential is also known as the Fermi level of solid-state physics.

== Definition and usage ==
In generic terms, electrochemical potential is the mechanical work done in bringing 1 mole of an ion from a standard state to a specified concentration and electrical potential. According to the IUPAC definition, it is the partial molar Gibbs energy of the substance at the specified electric potential, where the substance is in a specified phase. Electrochemical potential can be expressed as

$$\bar{\mu}_i = \mu_i + z_i F\Phi,$$

where:

- μ̅_{i} is the electrochemical potential of species i, in J/mol,
- μ_{i} is the chemical potential of the species i, in J/mol,
- z_{i} is the valency (charge) of the ion i, a dimensionless integer,
- F is the Faraday constant, in C/mol,
- Φ is the local electrostatic potential in V.

In the special case of an uncharged atom, z_{i} = 0, and so μ̅_{i} = μ_{i}.

Electrochemical potential is important in biological processes that involve molecular diffusion across membranes, in electroanalytical chemistry, and industrial applications such as batteries and fuel cells. It represents one of the many interchangeable forms of potential energy through which energy may be conserved.

In cell membranes, the electrochemical potential is the sum of the chemical potential and the membrane potential.

== Conflicting terminologies ==
It is common in electrochemistry and solid-state physics to discuss both the chemical potential and the electrochemical potential of the electrons. The definitions of these two terms are sometimes swapped, but this is rare and most sources use the convention described in this article.

The term electrochemical potential is sometimes used to mean an electrode potential (either of a corroding electrode, an electrode with a non-zero net reaction or current, or an electrode at equilibrium). In some contexts, the electrode potential of corroding metals is called "electrochemical corrosion potential", which is often abbreviated as ECP, and the word "corrosion" is sometimes omitted. This usage can lead to confusion. The two quantities have different meanings and different dimensions: the dimension of electrochemical potential is energy per mole while that of electrode potential is voltage (energy per charge).

== See also ==
- Concentration cell
- Electrochemical gradient
- Fermi level
- Membrane potential
- Nernst equation
- Poisson–Boltzmann equation
- Reduction potential
- Standard electrode potential
