= Thinktank, Birmingham Science Museum =

Science museum in England

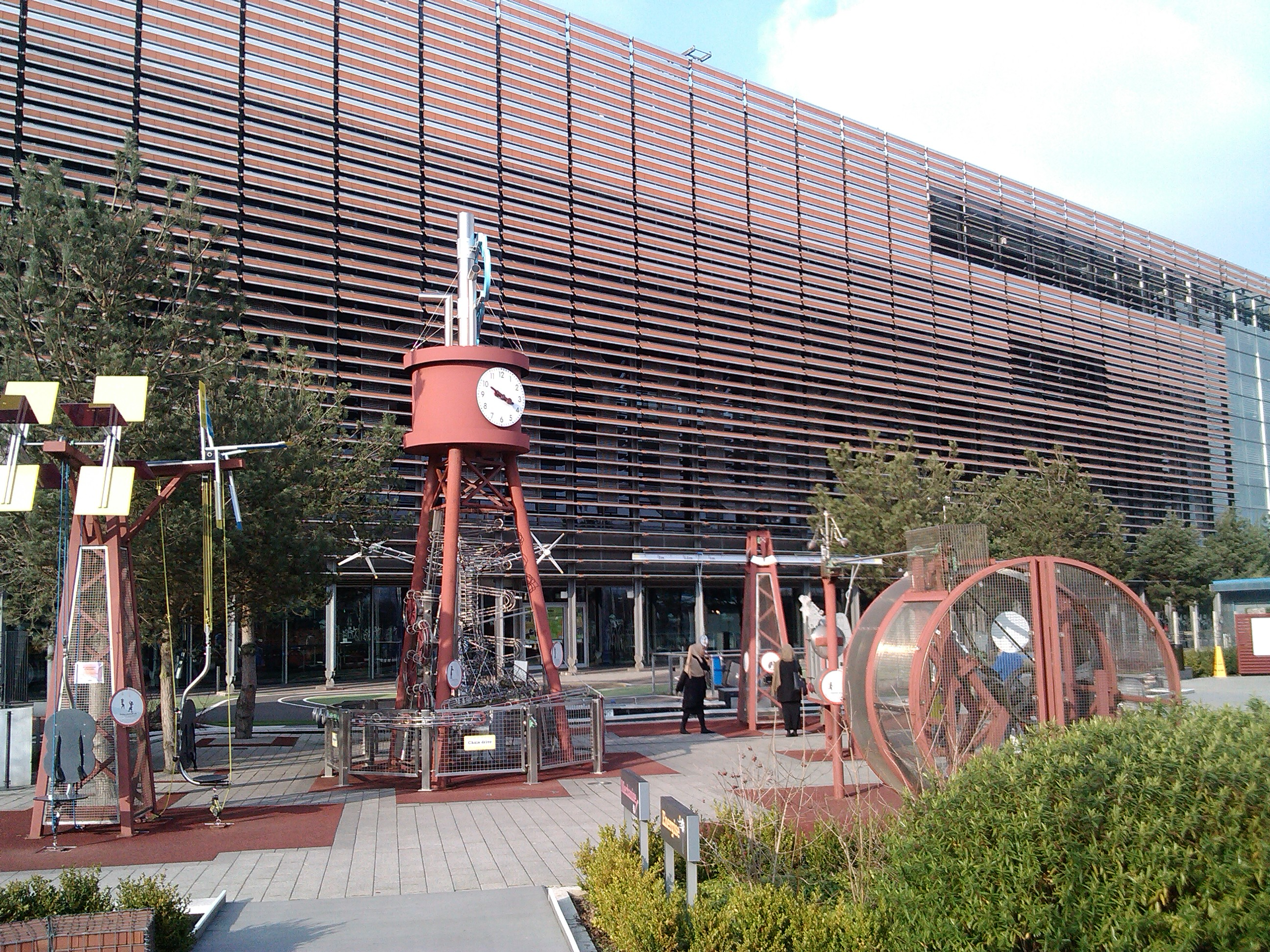
- The Science Garden at Thinktank

- Location in West Midlands
- Established: 2001
- Location: Millennium Point, Birmingham, England
- Coordinates: 52°28′58″N 1°53′10″W
- Type: Science and industry
- Visitors: 243,069 (2019)
- Website: birminghammuseums.org.uk/thinktank

Thinktank, Birmingham (formerly known as simply Thinktank) is a science museum in Birmingham, England. Opened in 2001, it is part of Birmingham Museums Trust and is located within the Millennium Point complex on Curzon Street, Digbeth.

== History ==
The Birmingham Collection of Science and Industry was started in the mid-19th century, initially consisting of collections of weapons from the gun trade and the Birmingham Proof House. The Birmingham Museum & Art Gallery opened in 1885, including science collections. In 1951, the Museum of Science and Industry opened at Elkington Silver Electroplating Works, Newhall Street. Over the following years, the museum acquired individual artefacts, as well as entire collections, that were related to local industry and the history of science and technology.

Birmingham City Council decided in 1995 to relocate the museum when it was given an opportunity by the Millennium Commission to construct a new building. The former museum closed in 1997, and Thinktank opened on 29 September 2001 as part of the £114-million Millennium Point complex. It was funded by Birmingham City Council, supported by the Millennium Commission. The area adjacent to the building is designated Eastside City Park. While many objects were put on display at Thinktank, others were stored at the Birmingham Museum Collection Centre, and some were brought out of storage.

Although the previous science museum was free to enter, Thinktank charges an entrance fee. In 2005 the museum underwent a £2 million upgrade, including the installation of a planetarium. By 2007 it had received over 1 million visitors. In April 2012, Birmingham Museums Trust took over governance and management responsibility for Thinktank, along with eight other sites.

In March 2015, a new "Spitfire gallery" opened, relating the displayed aircraft to their production, locally. Among the new exhibits are a leather flying helmet previously belonging to Helen Kerly, one of only two British civilian women commended for flying during the Second World War.

== Collections ==
=== Aircraft ===
Photo	Item	Description
	Supermarine Spitfire Mark IXc	ML 427, built in 1944, gifted by the Air Ministry in 1958. Suspended from ceiling. It was one of around 10,000 Spitfires that were manufactured at Castle Bromwich.
	Hawker Hurricane Mark IV	Number KX829. Built in 1943 by Hawker Aircraft Ltd, later owned by Loughborough College of Technology and given to the museum in 1961. Suspended from ceiling.

=== Locomotives ===
Photo	Item	Description
	46235 City of Birmingham	A LMS Princess Coronation Class steam locomotive, built in 1939, and given by the British Railways Board to the museum upon withdrawal in 1966.
	William Murdock's model steam carriage	1784

=== Trams ===
Photo	Item	Description
	Birmingham Corporation Tramways tram 395	The only surviving Birmingham tram.

=== Cars ===
Photo	Item	Description
	Railton Mobil Special	
	Mercedes-Benz car	Manufactured by Star Motor Company, Wolverhampton, in 1898, given to the museum in 1965.
	Lanchester petrol-electric car	Designed and manufactured by Frederick William Lanchester in 1926. Given to the museum in 1961.
	Austin 7	Austin 7 Tourer car, Registration number XO 4133. Built in 1923, owned by the factory until 1944 before passing to private ownership, given to the museum in 1975. It is the ninth oldest example of the ~300 remaining.
	Morris Mini-Minor	Registration number XEW 583, built in 1959, purchased by the museum in 1982.

=== Stationary steam engines ===
Thinktank, Birmingham Science Museum has a big collection of stationary steam engines. The following are some examples of them:

Photo	Item	Description
	Belliss Steam Generator	Dating from 1891, designed by Albert Charles Pain and Alfred Morcom, given by Belliss & Morcom Ltd in 1982.
	Crossley Vertical Atmospheric Gas Engine	Dating from 1873, designed by Eugen Langen and Nicolaus August Otto, given by T A W Clarke Ltd in 1976.
	Galloway Uniflow Engine	Dating from 1924, designed by Johann Stumpf, given by Hovis Ltd in 1956.
	Corliss Mill engine	A horizontal tandem compound steam, with Corliss valve gear. Made by Pollitt & Wigzell of Sowerby Bridge, West Yorkshire, England. Formerly at the University of Manchester.
	Easton & Amos pumping engine	Used from 1894 until the mid-1950s, at the Old Kent Road Gas Works, London, for pumping coal gas.
	Murray's Hypocycloidal Engine	Made around 1802, third-oldest working engine in the world. Given by N. Hingley & Sons Ltd in 1961.
	Smethwick Engine	The oldest working engine in the world, designed and built by James Watt in 1779, and in use until 1891. The engine was donated by Birmingham Canal Company to the museum in 1959. It was awarded a heritage award plaque by the Institution of Mechanical Engineers in 2014. It is run on steam power for several days each year, and its water lifting feature is demonstrated daily.
	Steam Pumping Engine 'Rollit'	Built in 1883, manufactured by James Watt & Co, Birmingham, given in 1958. Named for Albert Rollit, Mayor of Hull.

=== Other machines ===
Woolrich generator	The world's first heavy electrical machine
Button shank making machine	One of the earliest machines that was designed to manufacture a specific product. Designed by Ralph Heaton in 1794, powered by steam, and made nearly 750,000 button shanks a day back in 1851.

== Displays ==
Thinktank has four floors of over 200 hands-on exhibits and artefacts. Each floor has a theme, in general going from the past, in The Past (Level 0), through The Balcony (Level 1) and The Present (Level 2), to the future, in The Future gallery (Level 3). It has lost its theme as new items have been added.

Photo	Level	Gallery	Description
	0: The past	Boulton and Watt [CLOSED]	Display of objects relating to James Watt, Matthew Boulton, William Murdoch and associates, including other members of the Lunar Society. This area has since been removed.
	0: The past	Move It	Vehicles that were built in, or used around, the Birmingham area, including bikes, cars, trams, trains and planes. The gallery includes a pair of robots that display how a car is spot-welded during construction.
	0: The past	Power Up	The museum's steam engine collection. There is a display further on in the exhibition explaining the history of Boulton and Watt, and how they developed their engines. Other steam engines in this exhibition are those that have been used for pumping sewage, generating electricity, agricultural work and teaching. There is also a display explaining how power is currently generated by a steam turbine.
	1: The balcony	We made it	This gallery contains over 20 interactive exhibits and 1200 objects showing the history of Birmingham as "the workshop of the world", covering the production of everyday goods from raw materials to finished product. It is split into four sections: "Nuts and Bolts" on iron and steel goods, "Treasure" on precious metals and gemstones, "Tins and Things" on aluminium and decorative glass goods, and "Gadgets" on modern devices made of plastic and wood.
	1: The balcony	Spitfire Gallery [CLOSED]	A new gallery focused on the Spitfire is now open. It features a history of the Spitfire and its manufacture at Castle Bromwich, artefacts such as engine parts and flight suits, as well as hands-on exhibits including a model of a Rolls-Royce Merlin engine, designed by Arthur John Rowledge (1876–1957). Unfortunately, due to its weight of over 900 kg, the museum's Griffon engine, fitted to later Spitfire versions, could not be put on display This has been closed also.
	2: The Present	Things About Me	This exhibition is aimed at younger children, helping them to understand how their own body works, and how to keep it working. It is a bright and noisy gallery. There are small characters called TAMs (after the gallery name), who act as guides throughout the museum.
	2: The Present	Wild Life	This is a living history gallery containing insects, birds and mammals, as well as fossils. Taxidermied animals include a polar bear, a great auk and a pair of huia. Skeletons include a giant deer. Fossils include a Triceratops skull.
	2: The Present	The Street	The Street is designed to show visitors how science affects their everyday life, and how objects they see around them work. There is a Recycling Plant, which may close down as it has a few problems with the electronics.
	2: The Present	Kids' City [CLOSED]	Kids' City is an exhibition that has been designed for small children, aged 7 and younger. It is more of a play area than a traditional exhibition but also contains a garden with water feature, a health centre, café, as well as an animation studio featuring Shaun the Sheep.
	2: The Present	Medicine Matters	Medicine Matters is an exhibition that contains displays on modern medicine and medical breakthroughs, including current medical practices and the moral dilemmas that occur, while other exhibits cover DNA, epilepsy, genetics, vaccination and personal health.
	3: The Future	Futures	The Futures gallery deals with the impact of science, technology and medicine, both at present and in the future. The interactive gallery includes display screens, controlled with trackballs and buttons, with a "Futures" unit surrounding the space and a "Space Mapper" unit in the middle. There is also a "Talking Point" area about future projections by scientists, as well as "Create an Alien" and "RoboThespian" exhibits, which lets you program the robot to do whatever you want!
	Outdoor	Science Garden	The Science Garden is an interactive outdoor space with over 30 exhibits. It also includes an outdoor classroom for shows and school workshops. It is located in front of Thinktank, and forms part of the Eastside City Park.
	3: ---	Planetarium	Thinktank Planetarium opened on 17 December 2005. It was Birmingham's first planetarium, and the UK's first purpose-built digital planetarium. Its opening coincided with the closure of the London Planetarium. It has 70 seats, and the projection dome is 10 metres (33 ft) in diameter. The main operating system is Digistar 3. Six 1400×1050 DLP projectors, each connected to a PC, work together to produce a hemispherical image 3200×3200 pixels in size. In its first year it received 60,000 visitors, and in August 2014 it received 17,000 visitors. It is used to display stars as they would appear from on Earth at any point in time, and to simulate travel to the stars. On 4 August 2014 it was used to project the night sky as it would have appeared on 3 August 1914, as part of a World War I memorial event. Aside from projecting stars, digital planetariums can fill the dome with 360˚ of sound and video, and are therefore also known as immersive cinemas or 'fulldome' theatres. The planetarium displays films about space and the night sky, the human body and undersea exploration, as well as music and light shows. In September 2014 it was used to provide a live link with Tim Peake at a European Space Agency training camp as part of a British Association of Planetaria conference. The Planetarium can be noticed if you look closely in the Minibrum Area.

== Surroundings ==
The museum shares the Millennium Point building with Birmingham City University, and is situated in the Eastside district. It lies near Aston University and the Gun Quarter – which was for many years the centre of world's gun-manufacturing industry. Immediately opposite are The Woodman, a public house, and Curzon Street railway station - both listed buildings.
