= Ion transport number =

Fraction of total electric current carried in an electrolyte by an ionic species

In chemistry, ion transport number, also called the transference number, is the fraction of the total electric current carried in an electrolyte by a given ionic species i:

$$t_i = \frac{I_{i}}{I_\text{tot}}$$

Differences in transport number arise from differences in electrical mobility. For example, in an aqueous solution of sodium chloride, less than half of the current is carried by the positively charged sodium ions (cations) and more than half is carried by the negatively charged chloride ions (anions) because the chloride ions are able to move faster, i.e., chloride ions have higher mobility than sodium ions. The sum of the transport numbers for all of the ions in solution always equals unity:

$$\sum_i t_i = 1$$

The concept and measurement of transport number were introduced by Johann Wilhelm Hittorf in the year 1853. Liquid junction potential can arise from ions in a solution having different ion transport numbers.

At low, near zero concentration, the limiting ion transport numbers may be expressed in terms of the limiting molar conductivities of the cation ($\lambda_0^+$), anion ($\lambda_0^-$), and electrolyte ($\Lambda_0$):

$$t_+ = \nu^+ \cdot \frac{\lambda_0^+}{\Lambda_0}$$

and

$$t_- = \nu^- \cdot \frac{\lambda_0^-}{\Lambda_0},$$

where $\nu^+$ and $\nu^-$ are the numbers of cations and anions respectively per formula unit of electrolyte. In practice the molar ionic conductivities are calculated from the measured ion transport numbers and the total molar conductivity. For the cation $\lambda_0^+ = t_+ \cdot \tfrac{\Lambda_0}{\nu^+}$, and similarly for the anion. In solutions, where ionic complexation or association are important, two different transport/transference numbers can be defined.

The practical importance of high (i.e. close to 1) transference numbers of the charge-shuttling ion (i.e. Li^{+} in lithium-ion batteries) is related to the fact, that in single-ion devices (such as lithium-ion batteries) electrolytes with the transfer number of the ion near 1, concentration gradients do not develop. A constant electrolyte concentration is maintained during charge-discharge cycles. In case of porous electrodes a more complete utilization of solid electroactive materials at high current densities is possible, even if the ionic conductivity of the electrolyte is reduced.

== Experimental measurement ==
There are several experimental techniques for the determination of transport numbers. The Hittorf method is based on measurements of ion concentration changes near the electrodes. The moving boundary method involves measuring the speed of displacement of the boundary between two solutions due to an electric current.

=== Hittorf method ===
This method was developed by German physicist Johann Wilhelm Hittorf in 1853, and is based on observations of the changes in concentration of an electrolyte solution in the vicinity of the electrodes. In the Hittorf method, electrolysis is carried out in a cell with three compartments: anode, central, and cathode. Measurement of the concentration changes in the anode and cathode compartments determines the transport numbers. The exact relationship depends on the nature of the reactions at the two electrodes. For the electrolysis of aqueous copper(II) sulfate (CuSO_{4}) as an example, with Cu^{2+}(aq) and SO^{2−}_{4}(aq) ions, the cathode reaction is the reduction Cu^{2+}(aq) + 2 e^{−} → Cu(s) and the anode reaction is the corresponding oxidation of Cu to Cu^{2+}. At the cathode, the passage of $Q$ coulombs of electricity leads to the reduction of $Q/2F$ moles of Cu^{2+}, where $F$ is the Faraday constant. Since the Cu^{2+} ions carry a fraction $t_+$ of the current, the quantity of Cu^{2+} flowing into the cathode compartment is $t_+(Q/2F)$ moles, so there is a net decrease of Cu^{2+} in the cathode compartment equal to $(1-t_+)(Q/2F) = t_-(Q/2F)$. This decrease may be measured by chemical analysis in order to evaluate the transport numbers. Analysis of the anode compartment gives a second pair of values as a check, while there should be no change of concentrations in the central compartment unless diffusion of solutes has led to significant mixing during the time of the experiment and invalidated the results.

=== Moving boundary method ===
This method was developed by British physicists Oliver Lodge in 1886 and William Cecil Dampier in 1893. It depends on the movement of the boundary between two adjacent electrolytes under the influence of an electric field. If a colored solution is used and the interface stays reasonably sharp, the speed of the moving boundary can be measured and used to determine the ion transference numbers.

The cation of the indicator electrolyte should not move faster than the cation whose transport number is to be determined, and it should have same anion as the principal electrolyte. Besides the principal electrolyte (e.g., HCl) is kept light so that it floats on indicator electrolyte. CdCl_{2} serves best because Cd^{2+} is less mobile than H^{+} and Cl^{−} is common to both CdCl_{2} and the principal electrolyte HCl.

For example, the transport numbers of hydrochloric acid (HCl(aq)) may be determined by electrolysis between a cadmium anode and an Ag-AgCl cathode. The anode reaction is Cd → Cd^{2+} + 2 e^{−} so that a cadmium chloride (CdCl_{2}) solution is formed near the anode and moves toward the cathode during the experiment. An acid-base indicator such as bromophenol blue is added to make visible the boundary between the acidic HCl solution and the near-neutral CdCl_{2} solution. The boundary tends to remain sharp since the leading solution HCl has a higher conductivity than the indicator solution CdCl_{2}, and therefore a lower electric field to carry the same current. If a more mobile H^{+} ion diffuses into the CdCl_{2} solution, it will rapidly be accelerated back to the boundary by the higher electric field; if a less mobile Cd^{2+} ion diffuses into the HCl solution it will decelerate in the lower electric field and return to the CdCl_{2} solution. Also the apparatus is constructed with the anode below the cathode, so that the denser CdCl_{2} solution forms at the bottom.

The cation transport number of the leading solution is then calculated as

$$t_+ = \frac{z_+cLAF}{I\Delta t}$$

where $z_+$ is the cation charge, c the concentration, L the distance moved by the boundary in time Δt, A the cross-sectional area, F the Faraday constant, and I the electric current.

=== Concentration cells ===
This quantity can be calculated from the slope of the function $E_\mathrm{T} = f(E)$ of two concentration cells, without or with ionic transport.

The EMF of transport concentration cell involves both the transport number of the cation and its activity coefficient:

$$E_\mathrm{T} = - z \frac{RT}{F} \int_I^{II} t_+ d \ln a_{+/-}$$

where $a_2$ and $a_1$ are activities of HCl solutions of right and left hand electrodes, respectively, and $t_M$ is the transport number of Cl^{−}.

=== Electrophoretic magnetic resonance imaging method ===
This method is based on magnetic resonance imaging of the distribution of ions comprising NMR-active nuclei (usually ^{1}H, ^{19}F, ^{7}Li) in an electrochemical cells upon application of electric current.

== See also ==
- Activity coefficient
- Born equation
- Debye length
- Einstein relation (kinetic theory)
- Electrochemical kinetics
- Ion selective electrode
- ITIES
- Law of dilution
- Liquid junction potential
- Solvated electron
- Solvation shell
- Supporting electrolyte
- Thermogalvanic cell
- van't Hoff factor
