= Faying surface =

A faying surface is one of the surfaces that are in contact at a joint.

Faying surfaces may be connected to each other by bolts or rivets, adhesives, welding, or soldering. An example would be steel pipe flanges, in which the connected ends of the flanges would be faying surfaces.
