= Skærbæk Municipality =

Coordinates: 55.157°N 8.768°E

Skærbæk Municipality Skærbæk Kommune
- Former Municipality
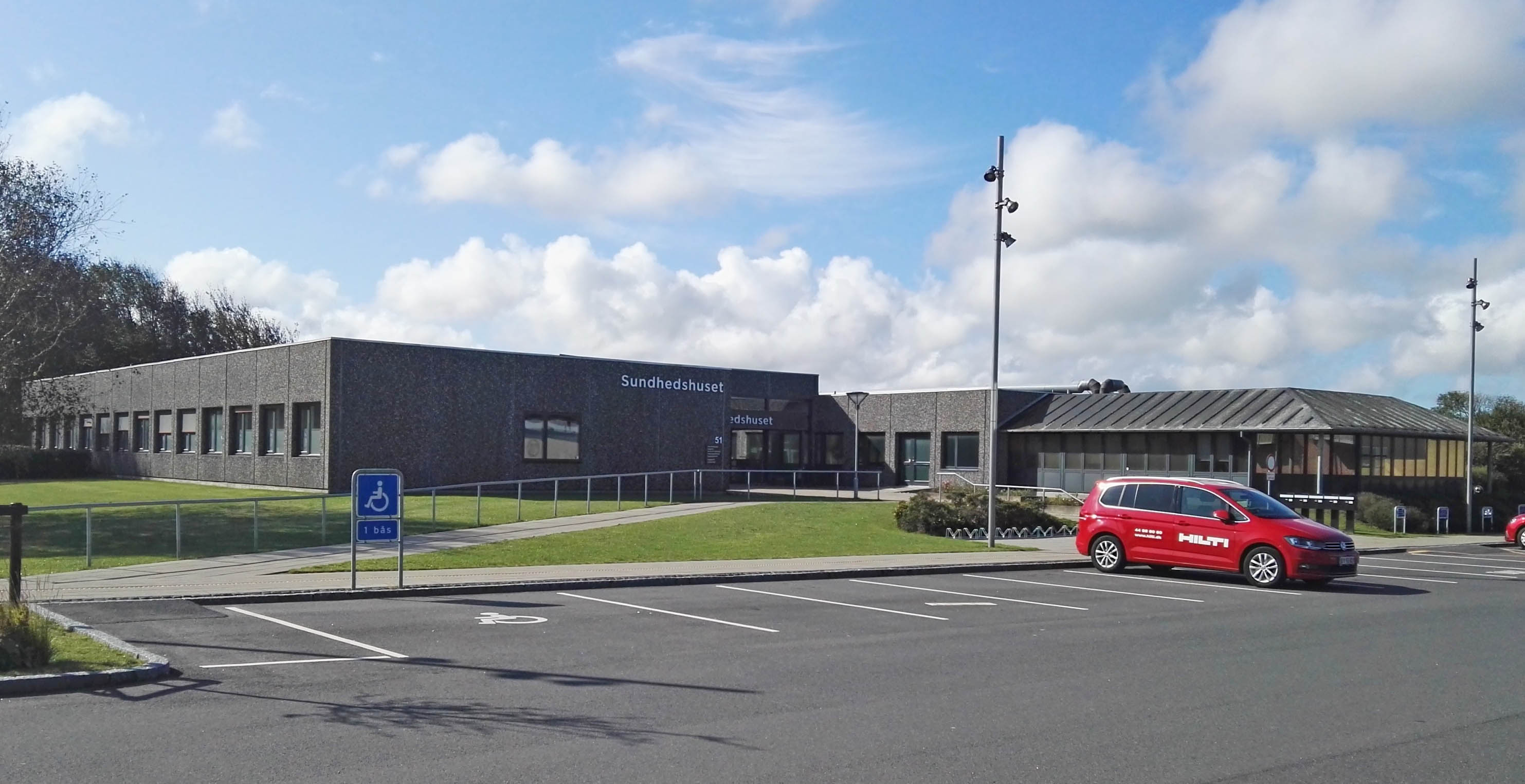
- The former townhall of Skærbæk Municipality
- Interactive map of Skærbæk Municipality
- Country: Denmark
- County: South Jutland County
- Formed: 1970
- Dissolved: 2007

Area
  - Total: 360 km^{2} (140 sq mi)

Population (2005)
  - Total: 7,294

Skærbæk Municipality was a municipality in Southern Jutland. It covered an area of 360 square kilometres (140 mi^{2}) and had a total population of 7,294 (2005). The municipality ceased to exist as the result of Kommunalreformen ("The Municipality Reform" of 2007) when it was merged with Bredebro, Højer, Løgumkloster, Nørre-Rangstrup, and Tønder municipalities to form the new Tønder Municipality. This created a municipality with an area of 1,352 square kilometres (522 mi^{2}) and a total population of 42,645 (2005).

The municipality was created in 1970 as the result of a kommunalreform ("Municipality Reform") that merged a number of existing parishes: Brøns Parish, Døstrup Parish, Mjolden Parish, Rejsby Parish, Rømø Parish, Skærbæk Parish, and Vodder Parish. The municipal seat was the town of Skærbæk. The municipality included the island of Rømø, the southernmost of Denmark's part of the North Frisian Islands.

== Notable people ==
- Jeppe Prætorius (1745 in Skærbæk – 1823) a Danish merchant and shipowner
- Jannik Petersen Bjerrum (1851 in Skærbæk – 1920) a Danish ophthalmologist
- Kirstine Meyer (1861 in Skærbæk – 1941) a Danish physicist
- Kenneth Fabricius (born 1981 in Skærbæk) a Danish professional footballer
