= Counterion condensation =

Counterion condensation is a phenomenon described by Manning's theory (Manning 1969), which assumes that counterions can condense onto polyions until the charged density between neighboring monomer charges along the polyion chain is reduced below a certain critical value. In the model the real polyion chain is replaced by an idealized line charge, where the polyion is represented by a uniformly charged thread of zero radius, infinite length and finite charge density, and the condensed counterion layer is assumed to be in physical equilibrium with the ionic atmosphere surrounding the polyion. The uncondensed mobile ions in the ionic atmosphere are treated within the Debye–Hückel (DH) approximation. The phenomenon of counterion condensation now takes place when the dimensionless Coulomb coupling strength

$$\Gamma = \lambda_B/l_{charge} > 1$$,

where $\lambda_B$ represents the Bjerrum length and $l_{charge}$ the distance between neighboring charged monomers. In this case the Coulomb interactions dominate over the thermal interactions and counterion condensation is favored. For many standard polyelectrolytes, this phenomenon is relevant, since the distance between neighboring monomer charges typically ranges between 2 and 3 Å and $\lambda_B \approx$ 7 Å in water. The Manning theory states that the fraction of "condensed" counter ions is $1-1/\Gamma$, where "condensed" means that the counter ions are located within the Manning radius $R_M$. At infinite dilution the Manning radius diverges and the actual concentration of ions close to the charged rod is reduced (in agreement with the law of dilution).

== Criticism ==
The counterion condensation originally only describes the behaviour of a charged rod. It competes here with Poisson-Boltzmann theory, which was shown to give less artificial results than the counterion condensation theories.
