= Frank Westheimer =

American chemist

- Born: January 15, 1912; Baltimore, Maryland, U.S.
- Died: April 14, 2007 (aged 95); Cambridge, Massachusetts, U.S.
- Education: Dartmouth College (BA); Harvard University (MS, PhD)
- Known for: Mechanisms of enzyme catalysis, and kinetic isotope effects
- Awards: Centenary Prize (1962); Willard Gibbs Award (1970); NAS Award in Chemical Sciences (1980); Rosenstiel Award (1980); Arthur C. Cope Award (1982); Welch Award in Chemistry (1982); William H. Nichols Medal (1982); National Medal of Science (1986); Priestley Medal (1988); Nakanishi Prize (1997)
- Scientific career
- Fields: Physical organic chemistry
- Workplaces: National Academy of Sciences; Harvard University
- Doctoral advisor: James Bryant Conant; Elmer P. Kohler
- Doctoral students: Emil T. Kaiser, Roberta F. Colman, Steven A. Benner

Frank Henry Westheimer (January 15, 1912 – April 14, 2007) was an American chemist. He taught at the University of Chicago from 1936 to 1954, and at Harvard University from 1953 to 1983, becoming the Morris Loeb Professor of Chemistry in 1960, and Professor Emeritus in 1983. The Westheimer medal was established in his honor in 2002.

Westheimer did pioneering work in physical organic chemistry, applying techniques from physical to organic chemistry and integrating the two fields. He explored the mechanisms of chemical and enzymatic reactions, and made fundamental theoretical advances.

Westheimer worked with John Gamble Kirkwood on the Bjerrum electrostatic analysis of carboxylic acids; with Joseph Edward Mayer on the calculation of molecular mechanics; explored the mechanisms of enzyme catalysis with Birgit Vennesland and determined the mechanisms of chromic acid oxidations and kinetic isotope effects.

He received the National Medal of Science in 1986 "For his series of extraordinary, original and penetrating investigations of the mechanisms of organic and enzymic reactions, which have played an unequaled role in the advancement of our knowledge of the ways in which chemical and biochemical processes proceed."

== Early life and education ==
Frank Henry Westheimer was born on January 15, 1912, to Henry F. Westheimer (1870–1960) and Carrie C (Burgunder) Westheimer (1887–1972) of Baltimore, Maryland.

He graduated from Dartmouth College in 1932. He went on to Harvard University, where he earned his masters in chemistry in 1933 and his doctorate in chemistry in 1935.

Westheimer came to Harvard hoping to do research with James Bryant Conant. When told that Conant would not take on new students, Westheimer outwaited him and was finally accepted as his last graduate student. Westheimer did some work on semicarbazone at Conant's suggestion. Conant also suggested that Westheimer work during the summer with Alsoph Corwin at Johns Hopkins University. By doing porphyrin synthesis with Corwin, Westheimer gained needed laboratory experience.

In 1933, Conant became president of Harvard in 1933 and ceased doing research. Nonetheless, Conant's interactions with Westheimer had a lasting effect, impressing Westheimer with the need "to do important things".

"The notion that Conant essentially was saying, 'Well, that problem is all right, but good God, you can do better,' was very important to me. From then on, I tried to ask myself about problems, whether they were really worth the investment of time."

Westheimer completed his Ph.D. with E.P. Kohler. Although Westheimer described Kohler's organic chemistry class as "marvelous", Kohler gave Westheimer little direction or feedback about his research, which was largely self-directed. Another of Kohler's students, Max Tishler, expanded upon some of Westheimer's research, leading to a co-publication on the derivation of a furanol.

In 1935 and 1936, as a National Research Council Fellow, Westheimer worked with physical chemist Louis P. Hammett at Columbia University. Hammett was a founder of the field of physical organic chemistry.

== Career ==
Westheimer taught at the University of Chicago from 1936 to 1954, and at Harvard University from 1953 to 1983. He served as chairman of the chemistry department at Harvard from 1959 to 1962. He became the Morris Loeb Professor of Chemistry at Harvard in 1960. He retired from teaching to become Professor Emeritus in 1983, and retired from research in 1988.

=== University of Chicago ===
Westheimer's first academic appointment was an independent Research Associateship at the University of Chicago, from 1936 to 1937. He became an instructor in 1937 and a Professor in 1948. As a lecturer in chemistry he taught the university's first course in physical organic chemistry.

During Westheimer's second year at Chicago, John Gamble Kirkwood taught there. Westheimer worked with Kirkwood on problems in organic chemistry involving electrostatics. Westheimer related electrostatics to their effects on the properties of organic compounds. Kirkwood and Westheimer published four classical papers developing fundamental ideas in enzymology about the theory of the electrostatic influence of substituents on the dissociation constants of organic acids. They developed a Bjerrum electrostatic analysis of carboxylic acids. Their Kirkwood-Westheimer model for an ellipsoid cavity reconciles the work of Niels Bjerrum on dibasic acids with that of Arnold Eucken on dipole substituted acids, showing that they could coexist in the same physical world. Elaborations and fuller testing of their ideas have required forty years and the development of computers.

During World War II, from 1943 to 1945, Westheimer worked for the National Defense Research Committee. He was a supervisor at the Explosives Research Laboratory in Bruceton, Pennsylvania. He did research on nitric acid, discovering a new acidity function for nitration reactions. He hesitated to discuss his work on the triphenyl carbinol series with physical chemists because of the secrecy requirements of the project. Other researchers such as Christopher Ingold were first to publish in the area.

Westheimer was also influenced by the development of statistical mechanics by physicists Joseph Edward Mayer and Maria Goeppert-Mayer, who moved to the University of Chicago in 1945. Westheimer applied the principles of statistical mechanics to the structure of organic molecules, to better understand the ways in which molecules are assembled from atoms. Westheimer first consulted Mayer about applying techniques from statistical mechanics to the racemization of optically active biphenyls. All of his calculations were worked out by hand. The work became a model for studies of other elements and is considered foundational. The field of molecular mechanics, as it is now known, has wide applications.

In 1943, Westheimer began publishing on the mechanisms of chromic acid oxidations, publishing a "masterly review" of the area in 1949.

In 1950, University of Chicago biochemist Birgit Vennesland approached Westheimer about a project she and her student Harvey Fisher were doing, involving isotopes in enzyme reactions. Vennesland had developed a project involving the fate of hydrogen atoms in alcohol dehydrogenase. Vennesland and Fisher's results were puzzling in that a specific hydrogen in the pair at C1 in ethanol appeared to be uniquely reactive in the presence of the enzyme. Westheimer joined the project and helped develop an explanation based on the idea of enantiotopicity to explain how the enzyme alcohol dehydrogenase removed hydrogen from the alcohol molecule, enabling the body to metabolize alcohol. The researchers published two classic papers in 1953, "the first demonstration of the enzymatic discrimination between the two enantiotopic hydrogen atoms on the methylene carbon atom of ethanol." The phenomenon they reported was not named enantiospecificity until much later. Westheimer designed additional experiments that proved their initial conjecture and established the isotope-based chirality of enzymes. This work was essential to understanding topicity, the enantiotopic and diastereotopic relationships between groups (or atoms) within molecules. In 2006, their 1953 paper (part I) received a Citation for Chemical Breakthrough Award from the Division of the History of Chemistry of the American Chemical Society.

=== Harvard University ===
In 1953, soon after completing the work on alcohol dehydrogenase, Westheimer moved to Harvard University. He continued his interest in reaction mechanisms, isotopes and oxidation. In 1955, Westheimer published the first of many articles on the chemistry of phosphate esters and phosphorus derivatives.

He proposed that ATP transfers phosphate through a reactive monomeric metaphosphate species. While this did not turn out to be the literal case, many enzymic reactions do proceed through transition states that have this as a significant component.

In a 1961 article, Westheimer applied ideas from statistical mechanics to the effects of isotopic substitution on the reactivity of organic molecules. His work on the magnitude of kinetic isotope effects (KIEs) is still the basis of understanding in the field. Transition state structure's dependence on the kinetic isotope effect is known as the Westheimer Effect. The standard nontunnelling approach to KIEs is developed from Westheimer and Lars Melander. The Melander-Westheimer postulate has successfully predicted the ways in which KIEs and transition state (TS) structures vary.

Westheimer introduced the idea of photoaffinity labeling of the active site of proteins. The identification of the "active sites" of an enzyme is difficult in cases where proteins have hydrocarbon-rich sites. In 1962, Westheimer and others demonstrated the synthesis of p-nitrophenyl diazoacetate and the subsequent acylation of chymotrypsin to form diazoacetylchymotrypsin, which was then photolyzed. The introduction of an aliphatic diazo group into a bifunctional reagent enabled it to react with the enzyme. The photolabel generated a reactive carbenoid species capable of inserting into hydrocarbon C-H bonds.

Westheimer also approached the reactions of phosphate transfer through mechanisms that involve five-coordinate intermediates. In 1968, Westheimer examined pseudorotation in phosphate ester chemistry and predicted the occurrence of pseudo-rotation of oxyphosphoranes. He showed the significance of this route and the importance of stereochemical rearrangements of the intermediates. Westheimer developed a set of guidelines, based on experimental observations, also known as Westheimer's rules. They have been widely used for describing and predicting the products and stereochemistry of substitution reactions involving phosphorus.

Westheimer's 1987 paper in Science, "Why nature chose phosphates", discusses the importance of phosphates as signaling and building blocks for living organisms. Phosphates possess a value of pK_{a} that allows them to be doubly ionized at physiological pH. The singly ionized form in the phosphodiester linkages of nucleic acids resists being hydrolyzed by water, but is not so stable that it won't undergo enzymatic hydrolysis. This work continues to challenge and inspire researchers studying biological chemistry and reactions in RNA, DNA, and ribozymes.

== Awards and honors ==
Westheimer became a member of the National Academy of Sciences in 1954, a member of the American Philosophical Society in 1976, and a foreign member of the Royal Society of London in 1983.

He chaired the National Academy of Sciences Committee for the Survey of Chemistry from 1964 to 1965. Chemistry: Opportunities and Needs, also known as the "Westheimer Report", encouraged the federal government to increase spending on fundamental research in chemistry, to achieve parity with other physical sciences. It identified biochemistry as a promising and overlooked area for medical and pharmaceutical research. The report's recommendations were implemented, and it is still considered to be "comprehensive, definitive, and forward-looking".

Westheimer was a member of President Lyndon Johnson's science advisory committee from 1967 to 1970.

Westheimer served on the Council of the National Academy of Sciences for two terms, from 1973 to 1975 and 1976-1978, as well as being a Councillor of the American Philosophical Society (1981-1984), and Secretary of the American Academy of Arts and Sciences (1985-1990).

As well as emphasizing the need for fundamental research, Westheimer was concerned about other political issues. He argued against wars in Vietnam and Iraq. He was aware of environmental issues, supporting measures to decrease pollution, combat global warming, increase energy conservation, and develop alternative energy sources. He advocated that science needed to be taught in new ways, to better educate nonscientists about scientific issues.

Among Westheimer's many honors are the U.S. National Academy Award in Chemical Sciences in 1980, the Robert A. Welch Foundation Award in 1982, the Golden Plate Award of the American Academy of Achievement in 1981, the U.S. National Medal of Science in 1986, the Priestley Medal in 1988; the Repligen Award for the Chemistry of Biological Processes in 1992; and the Nakanishi Prize in 1997.

"Over a span of four decades, Westheimer repeatedly demonstrated an ability to take up a fundamental scientific problem — one that appeared either insoluble or very difficult — and to solve it in an elegant and completely definitive way... He enjoyed going on to new challenges more than exploiting the large new areas that he had opened up." Elias James Corey, 2007

The Westheimer medal was established in his honor in 2002. The medal is awarded by Harvard University "for distinguished research into the field of chemistry", particularly in the areas of organic and biological chemistry.

== Family ==
Frank H. Westheimer was married in 1937 to Jeanne E. Friedman. They had two children, Ellen Westheimer and Ruth Susan Westheimer.
