= Virtual breakdown mechanism =

Concept in Electrochemistry

The Virtual breakdown mechanism is a concept in the field of electrochemistry. In electrochemical reactions, when the cathode and the anode are close enough to each other (i.e., so-called "nanogap electrochemical cells"), the double layer of the regions from the two electrodes is overlapped, forming a large electric field uniformly distributed inside the entire electrode gap. Such high electric fields can significantly enhance the ion migration inside bulk solutions and thus increase the entire reaction rate, akin to the "breakdown" of the reactant(s). However, it is fundamentally different from the traditional "breakdown".

The Virtual breakdown mechanism was discovered in 2017 when researchers studied pure water electrolysis based on deep-sub-Debye-length nanogap electrochemical cells. Furthermore, researchers found the relation of the gap distance between cathodes and anodes to the performance of electrochemical reactions.

== Electric field distribution ==
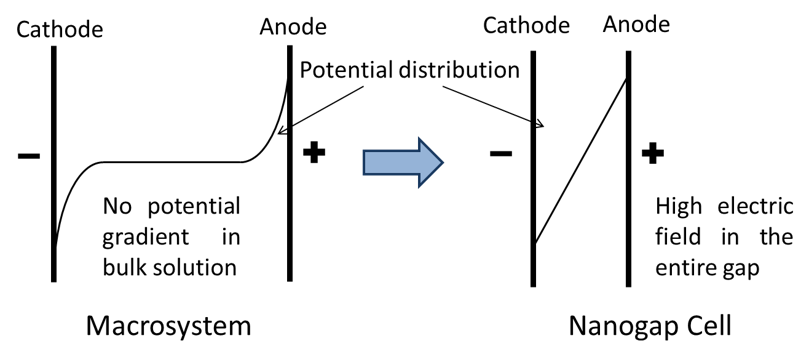
Schematic diagram of potential distribution comparison between macrosystem and nanogap cells

The fundamental difference between traditional cells and nanogap cells is their electric potential distribution. This is the premise of the "virtual breakdown" effect.

For electrochemical reactions with high-concentration electrolyte in the macrosystem, the Debye-length is quite small. Due to the screening effect almost all of the potential drop is confined within the small Debye-length region (or double layer region). The potential in bulk solution (far from the electrodes) does not change too much, meaning that there is nearly zero electric field inside the bulk solution. However, when the counter electrode is within the Debye-length region (i.e., nanogap electrochemical cells), two double layers from anode and cathode overlap with each other. The electrostatic potential inside the entire gap changes dramatically, meaning that the huge electric field is uniformly distributed across the entire gap.

== Pure water electrolysis ==
We shall consider pure water electrolysis as an example to explain the concept of the Virtual breakdown mechanism.

=== Pure water electrolysis in macrosystem ===
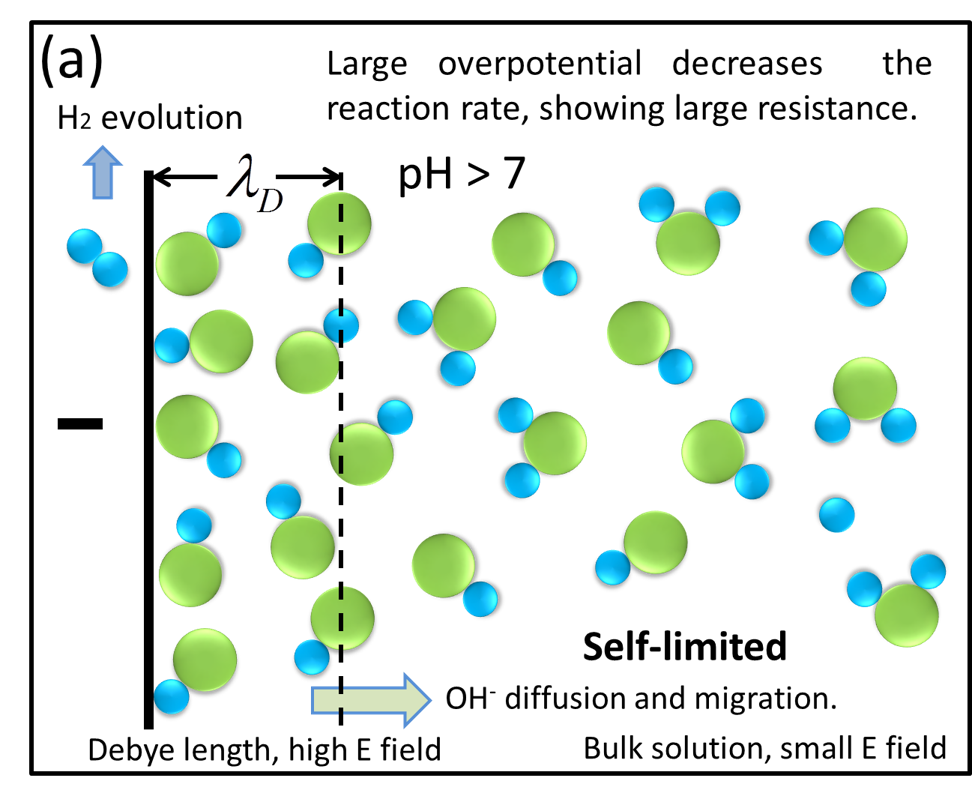
Pure water in macrosystem cannot be split efficiently due to the lack of rapid ions transport inside bulk solution.

For the analysis of water electrolysis, we shall use H_{3}O^{+} ions (also known as oxonium ions) at the cathode, as an example to explain the traditional reactions.

Water molecules self-ionize to H_{3}O^{+} and OH^{−} ions. Near the cathode surface (within the double layer region), newly generated H_{3}O^{+} ions become hydrogen gas after obtaining electrons from the cathode; however because there is nearly no electric field inside the bulk solution (see section "Electric field distribution"), OH^{−} ions can only transport through the bulk solution very slowly by diffusion. Moreover, in pure water the intrinsic H_{3}O^{+} concentration is only 10^{−7} mol/L, not enough to neutralize the newly generated OH^{−} ions. In this way OH^{−} ions accumulate locally at the cathode surface (turning the solution near cathode into alkaline). Due to Le Chatelier's principle for water self-ionization,

$\ce{H3O+ + OH- <=> 2H2O}$

the OH^{−} ions accumulation impede further self-ionization of the water, which reduces the hydrogen evolution rate and eventually prevents water electrolysis. In this case water electrolysis becomes very slow or even halts; this manifests as a large equivalent resistance between the two electrodes.

This is why in the macrosystem pure water cannot be electrolyzed efficiently - the fundamental reason is the lack of rapid ion transport inside the bulk solution.

=== Pure water electrolysis in nanogap cell ===
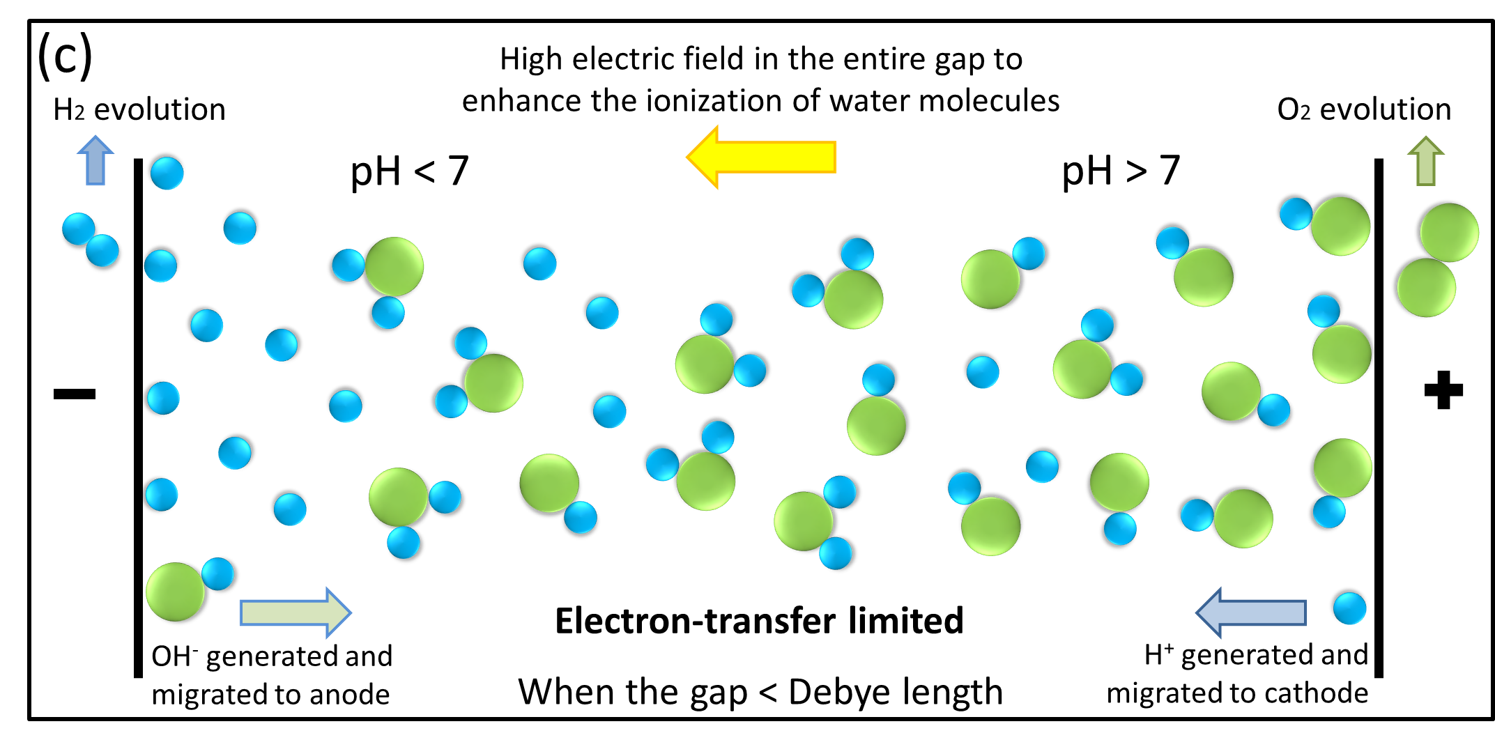
In nanogap cell, high electric field in the entire gap can enhance water ionization and mass transport (mainly migration), leading to pure water splitting efficiently limited by electron-transfer.

In nanogap cells the high electric field can distribute uniformly across the entire gap (see section "Electric field distribution"). This is different from ion transport in the macrosystem: now newly generated OH^{−} ions can immediately migrate from cathode to anode. In the case where the two electrodes are close enough, the mass transport rate can be even larger than the electron-transfer rate. This results in OH^{−} ions clustering for electron-transfer at the anode, rather than accumulating at the cathode. In this way the entire reaction can keep going and not self-limit.

Notice that for pure water electrolysis in nanogap cells, the net OH^{−} ion accumulation near the anode not only increases the local reactant concentration but also decreases the overpotential requirement (as in the Frumkin effect). According to Butler–Volmer equation, such ion accumulation increases the electrolysis current, i.e. the water splitting throughput and efficiency.

Thus even pure water can be efficiently electrolyzed, when the electrode gap is small enough.

=== Virtual breakdown mechanism ===
In reality water molecule dissociation (the splitting into H_{3}O^{+} and OH^{−} ions) occurs only at the electrode region (because of the ions continuously consumed at the two electrodes); however it effectively appears that the molecules split in the middle of the gap, with H_{3}O^{+} ions migrating towards the cathode and OH^{−} ions migrating towards the anode, respectively. The assistance of the huge electric field in the nano-gap (see section "Electric field distribution") not only increases the transport rate but also the water molecules' ionization has been enhanced (i.e. local concentration has been enhanced). Looking from a microscopic perspective, the total effect appears like the breakdown of water molecules.

However this effect is not traditional breakdown, which in fact requires a much larger electric field around 1 V/Å. In the nanogap cells the huge electric field is still not large enough to split water molecules directly. However it can take advantage of the self-ionization of water, facilitating the equilibrium reaction to shift in the ionization direction.

$\ce{2H2O -> H3O+ + OH-}$

Such field-assisted ionization, with the fast ion transport (mainly migration), performs in a very similar way to the breakdown of water molecules; that is why this field-assisted effect is named the "virtual breakdown mechanism".

Consider the equation of conductivity,

$\sigma=nq\mu$

Here the ion charges are not changed. The ion concentration is enhanced but only contributes to the conductivity partially. The fundamental change here is that "apparent mobility" has been significantly enhanced, as the "breakdown" effect. (In traditional electrochemical cells, although the ion intrinsic mobility is high, since there is nearly zero electric field inside bulk solution, it cannot contribute to the conductivity.) Consider the equivalent resistance between the two electrodes, as given by:

$R=\rho{L \over S}$

When we decrease the gap distance between the two electrodes, not only does the value of L decrease but also the value of resistivity decreases as well; this in fact contributes more to the decrease of the total resistance.

This "virtual breakdown mechanism" can be applied to almost all kinds of weakly-ionized materials; in fact, such weaker ionization can lead to larger Debye-length inside the solution. At the same size scale it actually helps to achieve the virtual breakdown effect.

== Gap size effect ==
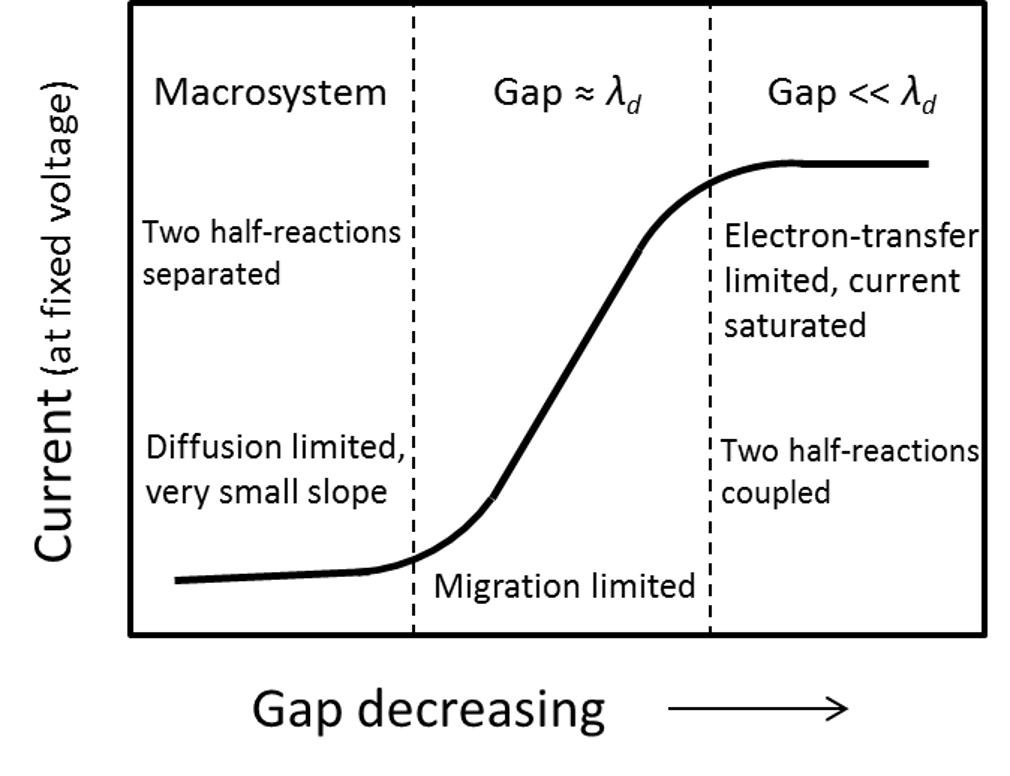
Phase diagram of electrochemical performance vs. gap distance

The phase diagram shows the importance of the electrode gap distance to the performance of electrochemical reactions. For traditional macrosystems, where the electrode gap distance is much larger than the Debye-length, two half-reactions are decoupled and cannot influence each other. Normally the electrochemical current is limited by a slow diffusion step. When the gap distance is reduced to around the Debye-length, a large electric field can form between the two electrodes (due to double layers and the two regions overlapping with each other); this enhances the mass transport rate. In this region the electrolysis current is very sensitive to the gap distance and the reactions are migration-rate limited. When the gap distance is further reduced to the deep-sub-Debye-length region, the mass transport can be enhanced further to a level even faster than the electron-transfer step. In this region, even when we shrink the gap distance further, the current cannot be enlarged any more, meaning that the current has reached saturation. Here the two half-reactions are coupled together and the reactions are limited by the electron-transfer steps.

Therefore, by just adjusting the gap distance, the fundamental performance of the electrochemical reactions can be significantly changed.
