= Tscherning =

Tscherning is a German surname. It may refer to:

- Andreas Tscherning (1611–1659), German poet
- Anton Frederik Tscherning (1795–1874), Danish army officer who became a politician
- Eleonora Tscherning (1817–1890), Danish painter
- Henny Tscherning (1853–1932), Danish nurse and trade unionist
- Marius Tscherning (1854–1939), Danish ophthalmologist
- Willy Tscherning (1917–2012), German Oberfeldwebel during World War II

== See also ==
- Emil Paul Tscherrig (1947–2026), Swiss Roman Catholic cardinal and apostolic nuncio
