= Grut =

Grut is a Nordic surname that may refer to:

- Edmund Hansen Grut (1831–1907), Danish ophthalmologist
- Thomas Alfred Grut (1852–1933), Guernsey photographer and author
- Torben Grut (1871–1945), Swedish architect
- William Grut (1914–2012), Swedish modern pentathlete, son of Torben
