= Skærbæk, Tønder =

Skærbæk
- Town
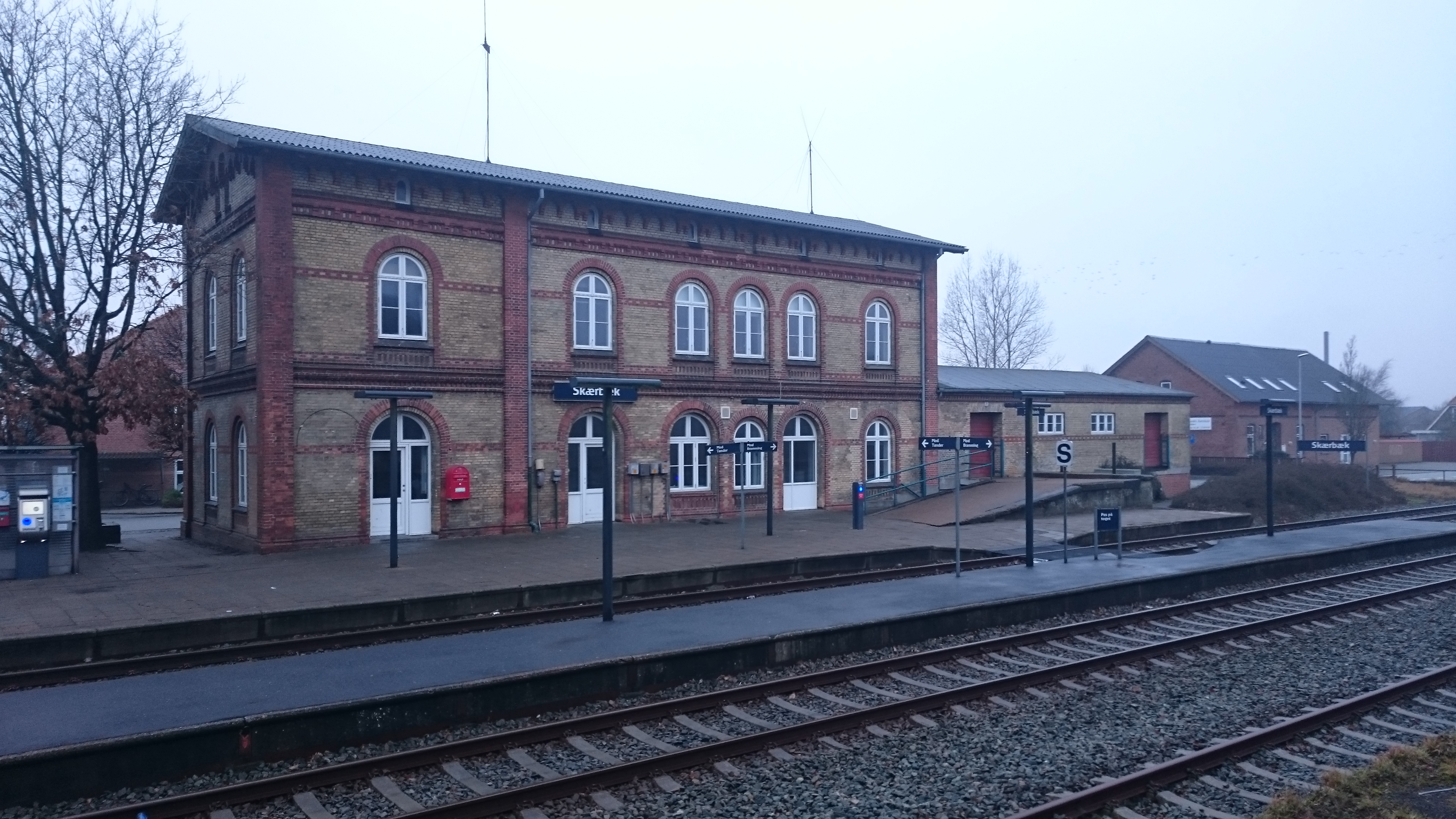
- Skærbæk railway station

- Location in Denmark Skærbæk (Region of Southern Denmark)
- Coordinates: 55°9′31″N 8°46′17″E
- Country: Denmark
- Region: Southern Denmark
- Municipality: Tønder Municipality

Area
  - Urban: 3.1 km^{2} (1.2 sq mi)

Population (2026)
  - Urban: 3,217
  - Urban density: 1,000/km^{2} (2,700/sq mi)
- Time zone: UTC+1 (CET)
  - Summer (DST): UTC+2 (CEST)
- Postal code: DK-6780 Skærbæk

Skærbæk (German: Scherrebek) is a railway town, with a population of 3,217 (1 January 2026), in Tønder Municipality, Region of Southern Denmark on the Jutland peninsula in south Denmark. It is located 24 km northeast of Havneby on the island of Rømø, 24 km west of Toftlund, 22 km south of Ribe and 26 km north of Tønder.

Skærbæk was the municipal seat of the former Skærbæk Municipality, until 1 January 2007.

== Skærbæk Church ==
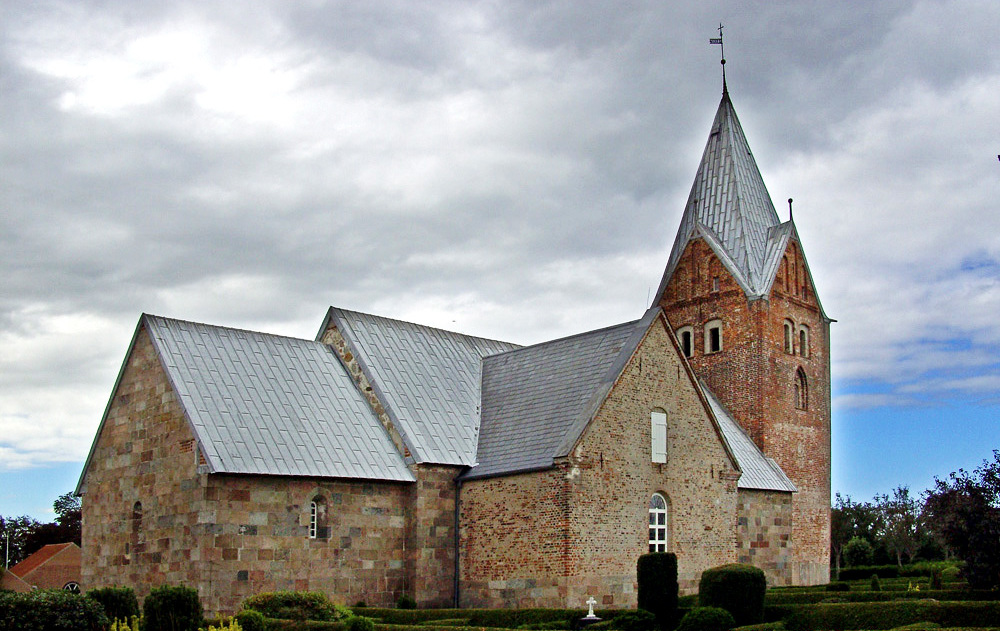
Skærbæk Church

Skærbæk Church is first mentioned in the sources in 1292 and it is then said that it is dedicated to St. Simon and Skt. Judas (son of Jacob).

== Transportation ==
Skærbæk is served by Skærbæk railway station on the Bramming–Tønder railway line.

== Notable people ==
- Jeppe Prætorius (1745-1823) a Danish merchant and shipowner, was born in Skærbæk.
- Jannik Petersen Bjerrum (1851-1920) a Danish ophthalmologist, was born in Skærbæk
- Kirstine Meyer (1861-1941) a Danish physicist, was born in Skærbæk.
- The former professional footballer Kenneth Fabricius is born in Skærbæk.
