= Electric-field screening =

Damping of electric fields

Screening in a plasma. A cloud of negative charges forms around a large positive charge placed in a plasma, shielding the rest of the plasma from the positive charge's influence.

In physics, screening is the damping of electric fields caused by the presence of mobile charge carriers. It is an important part of the behavior of charge-carrying mediums, such as ionized gases (classical plasmas), electrolytes, and electronic conductors (semiconductors, metals). In a fluid, with a given permittivity ε, composed of electrically charged constituent particles, each pair of particles (with charges q_{1} and q_{2}) interact through the Coulomb force as
$$\mathbf{F} = \frac{q_1 q_2}{4\pi\varepsilon \left|\mathbf{r}\right|^2}\hat{\mathbf{r}},$$
where the vector r is the relative position between the charges. This interaction complicates the theoretical treatment of the fluid. For example, a naive quantum mechanical calculation of the ground-state energy density yields infinity, which is unreasonable. The difficulty lies in the fact that even though the Coulomb force diminishes with distance as 1/r^{2}, the average number of particles at each distance r is proportional to r^{2}, assuming the fluid is fairly isotropic. As a result, a charge fluctuation at any one point has non-negligible effects at large distances.

In reality, these long-range effects are suppressed by the flow of particles in response to electric fields. This flow reduces the effective interaction between particles to a short-range "screened" Coulomb interaction. This system corresponds to the simplest example of a renormalized interaction.

In solid-state physics, especially for metals and semiconductors, the screening effect describes the electrostatic field and Coulomb potential of an ion inside the solid. Like the electric field of the nucleus is reduced inside an atom or ion due to the shielding effect, the electric fields of ions in conducting solids are further reduced by the cloud of conduction electrons.

== Description ==
Consider a fluid composed of electrons moving in a uniform background of positive charge (one-component plasma). Each electron possesses a negative charge. According to Coulomb's interaction, negative charges repel each other. Consequently, this electron will repel other electrons creating a small region around itself in which there are fewer electrons. This region can be treated as a positively charged "screening hole". Viewed from a large distance, this screening hole has the effect of an overlaid positive charge which cancels the electric field produced by the electron. Only at short distances, inside the hole region, can the electron's field be detected. For a plasma, this effect can be made explicit by an $N$-body calculation. If the background is made up of positive ions, their attraction by the electron of interest reinforces the above screening mechanism. In atomic physics, a germane effect exists for atoms with more than one electron shell: the shielding effect. In plasma physics, electric-field screening is also called Debye screening or shielding. It manifests itself on macroscopic scales by a sheath (Debye sheath) next to a material with which the plasma is in contact.

The screened potential determines the inter atomic force and the phonon dispersion relation in metals. The screened potential is used to calculate the electronic band structure of a large variety of materials, often in combination with pseudopotential models. The screening effect leads to the independent electron approximation, which explains the predictive power of introductory models of solids like the Drude model, the free electron model and the nearly free electron model.

== Theory and models ==
The first theoretical treatment of electrostatic screening, due to Peter Debye and Erich Hückel, dealt with a stationary point charge embedded in a fluid.

Consider a fluid of electrons in a background of heavy, positively charged ions. For simplicity, we ignore the motion and spatial distribution of the ions, approximating them as a uniform background charge. This simplification is permissible since the electrons are lighter and more mobile than the ions, provided we consider distances much larger than the ionic separation. In condensed matter physics, this model is referred to as jellium.

=== Screened Coulomb interactions ===
Let ρ denote the number density of electrons, and φ the electric potential. At first, the electrons are evenly distributed so that there is zero net charge at every point. Therefore, φ is initially a constant as well.

We now introduce a fixed point charge Q at the origin. The associated charge density is Qδ(r), where δ(r) is the Dirac delta function. After the system has returned to equilibrium, let the change in the electron density and electric potential be Δρ(r) and Δφ(r) respectively. The charge density and electric potential are related by Poisson's equation, which gives
$$-\nabla^2 [\Delta\phi(r)] = \frac{1}{\varepsilon_0} [Q\delta(r) - e\Delta\rho(r)],$$
where ε_{0} is the vacuum permittivity.

To proceed, we must find a second independent equation relating Δρ and Δφ. We consider two possible approximations, under which the two quantities are proportional: the Debye–Hückel approximation, valid at high temperatures (e.g. classical plasmas), and the Thomas–Fermi approximation, valid at low temperatures (e.g. electrons in metals).

==== Debye–Hückel approximation ====
In the Debye–Hückel approximation, we maintain the system in thermodynamic equilibrium, at a temperature T high enough that the fluid particles obey Maxwell–Boltzmann statistics. At each point in space, the density of electrons with energy j has the form
$$\rho_j(r) = \rho_j^{(0)}(r)\; \exp\left[\frac{e\phi(r)}{k_\mathrm{B}T}\right]$$
where k_{B} is the Boltzmann constant. Perturbing in φ and expanding the exponential to first order, we obtain
$$e\Delta\rho \simeq \varepsilon_0 k_0^2\Delta\phi$$
where
$$k_0\ \stackrel{\mathrm{def}}{=}\ \sqrt{\frac{\rho e^2}{\varepsilon_0 k_\mathrm{B}T}}$$

The associated length λ_{D} ≡ 1/k_{0} is called the Debye length. The Debye length is the fundamental length scale of a classical plasma.

==== Thomas–Fermi approximation ====
In the Thomas–Fermi approximation, named after Llewellyn Thomas and Enrico Fermi, the system is maintained at a constant electron chemical potential (Fermi level) and at low temperature. The former condition corresponds, in a real experiment, to keeping the metal/fluid in electrical contact with a fixed potential difference with ground. The chemical potential μ is, by definition, the energy of adding an extra electron to the fluid. This energy may be decomposed into a kinetic energy T part and the potential energy −eφ part. Since the chemical potential is kept constant,
$$\Delta\mu = \Delta T - e\Delta\phi = 0.$$

If the temperature is extremely low, the behavior of the electrons comes close to the quantum mechanical model of a Fermi gas. We thus approximate T by the kinetic energy of an additional electron in the Fermi gas model, which is simply the Fermi energy E_{F}. The Fermi energy for a 3D system is related to the density of electrons (including spin degeneracy) by
$$\rho = 2 \frac{1}{(2\pi)^3}\left( \frac{4}{3} \pi k_\mathrm{F}^3 \right), \quad
E_\mathrm{F} = \frac{\hbar^2 k_F^2}{2m},$$
where k_{F} is the Fermi wavevector. Perturbing to first order, we find that
$$\Delta\rho \simeq \frac{3\rho}{2E_\mathrm{F}} \Delta E_\mathrm{F}.$$

Inserting this into the above equation for Δμ yields
$$e \Delta\rho \simeq \varepsilon_0 k_0^2 \Delta\phi$$
where
$$k_0\ \stackrel{\mathrm{def}}{=}\ \sqrt{\frac{3e^2\rho}{2\varepsilon_0 E_\mathrm{F}}} = \sqrt{\frac{m e^{2} k_{\mathrm{F}}}{\varepsilon_{0} \pi^2 \hbar^2}}$$
is called the Thomas–Fermi screening wave vector.

This result follows from the equations of a Fermi gas, which is a model of non-interacting electrons, whereas the fluid, which we are studying, contains the Coulomb interaction. Therefore, the Thomas–Fermi approximation is only valid when the electron density is low, so that the particle interactions are relatively weak.

==== Result: Screened potential ====
Our results from the Debye–Hückel or Thomas–Fermi approximation may now be inserted into Poisson's equation. The result is
$$\left[ \nabla^2 - k_0^2 \right] \phi(r) = -\frac{Q}{\varepsilon_0} \delta(r),$$
which is known as the screened Poisson equation. The solution is
$$\phi(r) = \frac{Q}{4\pi\varepsilon_0 r} e^{-k_0 r},$$
which is called a screened Coulomb potential. It is a Coulomb potential multiplied by an exponential damping term, with the strength of the damping factor given by the magnitude of k_{0}, the Debye or Thomas–Fermi wave vector. Note that this potential has the same form as the Yukawa potential. This screening yields a dielectric function that shows spatial dispersion, i.e., it depends in reciprocal space on the $k$-vector. By Fourier transforming the Yukawa potential, one gets $\varepsilon(k) = \varepsilon_0 (1 + (k_0/k)^2)$ (see also Thomas-Fermi screening).

== Many-body theory ==
=== Classical physics and linear response ===
A mechanical $N$-body approach provides together the derivation of screening effect and of Landau damping. It deals with a single realization of a one-component plasma whose electrons have a velocity dispersion (for a thermal plasma, there must be many particles in a Debye sphere, a volume whose radius is the Debye length). On using the linearized motion of the electrons in their own electric field, it yields an equation of the type
$$\mathcal{E}\Phi = S,$$

where ${\mathcal{E}}$ is a linear operator, $S$ is a source term due to the particles, and $\Phi$ is the Fourier-Laplace transform of the electrostatic potential. When substituting an integral over a smooth distribution function for the discrete sum over the particles in ${\mathcal{E}}$, one gets
$$\varepsilon(\mathbf{k}, \omega)\, \Phi(\mathbf{k}, \omega) = S(\mathbf{k}, \omega),$$
where $\varepsilon(\mathbf{k}, \omega)$ is the plasma permittivity, or dielectric function, classically obtained by a linearized Vlasov-Poisson equation, $\mathbf{k}$ is the wave vector, $\omega$ is the frequency, and $S(\mathbf{k},\omega)$ is the sum of $N$ source terms due to the particles.

By inverse Fourier-Laplace transform, the potential due to each particle is the sum of two parts One corresponds to the excitation of Langmuir waves by the particle, and the other one is its screened potential, as classically obtained by a linearized Vlasovian calculation involving a test particle. The screened potential is the above screened Coulomb potential for a thermal plasma and a thermal particle. For a faster particle, the potential is modified. Substituting an integral over a smooth distribution function for the discrete sum over the particles in $S(\mathbf{k},\omega)$, yields the Vlasovian expression enabling the calculation of Landau damping.

=== Quantum-mechanical approach ===
In real metals, the screening effect is more complex than described above in the Thomas–Fermi theory. The assumption that the charge carriers (electrons) can respond at any wavevector is just an approximation. However, it is not energetically possible for an electron within or on a Fermi surface to respond at wavevectors shorter than the Fermi wavevector. This constraint is related to the Gibbs phenomenon, where Fourier series for functions that vary rapidly in space are not good approximations unless a very large number of terms in the series are retained. In physics, this phenomenon is known as Friedel oscillations, and applies both to surface and bulk screening. In each case the net electric field does not fall off exponentially in space, but rather as an inverse power law multiplied by an oscillatory term. Theoretical calculations can be obtained from quantum hydrodynamics and density functional theory (DFT).

== See also ==
- Bjerrum length
- Debye length
