= Bjerrum's area =

Central 25° of the visual field from the fixation point

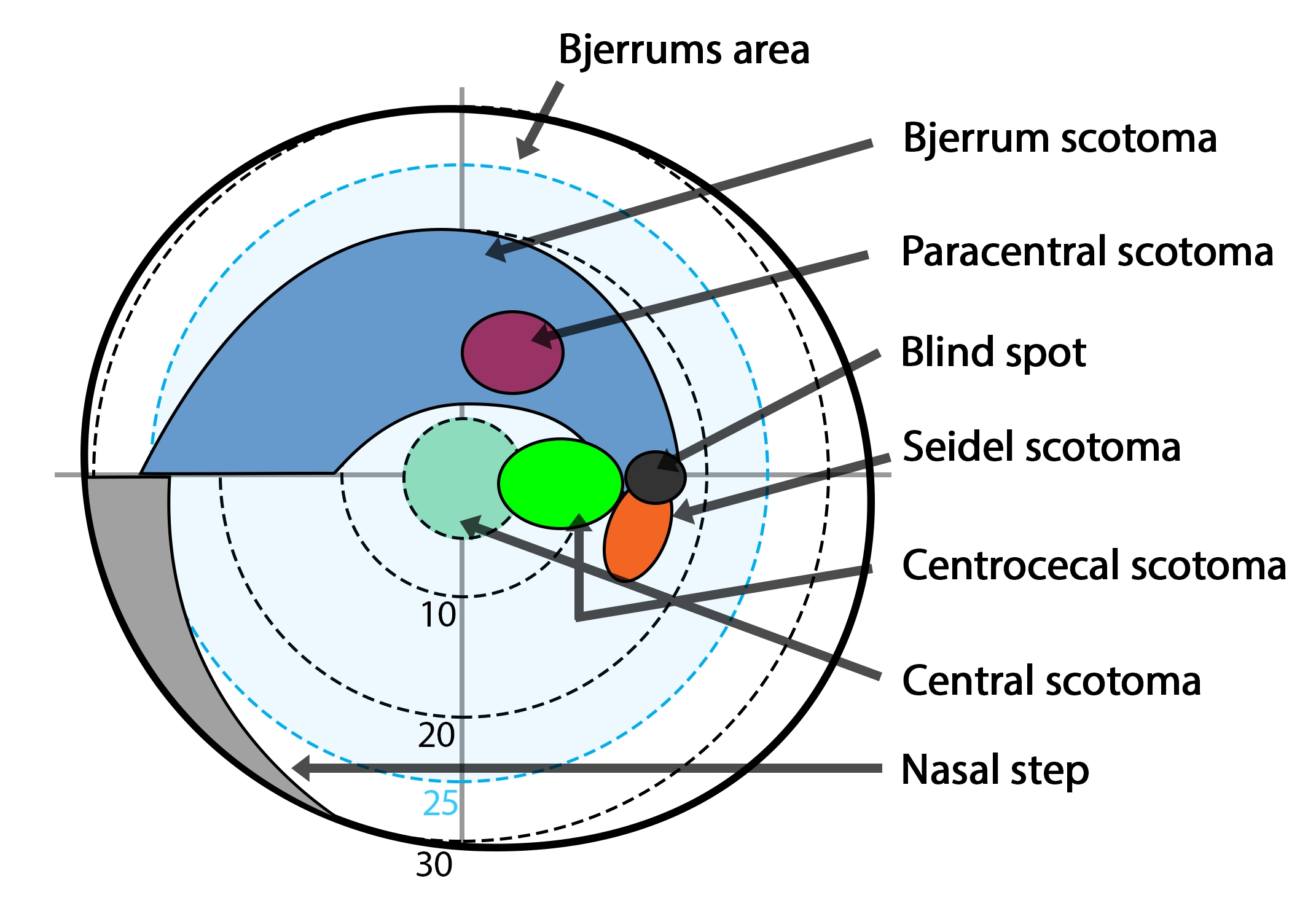
Location of Bjerrum's area, and common types of scotomas. Bjerrums area is marked with a dotted blue line at 25 degrees.

Bjerrum's area is the central 25° of the visual field from the fixation point, popularized scientifically by the Danish ophthalmologist Jannik Petersen Bjerrum.

Bjerrum believed that this central portion of the visual field was of far more often use than the perimeter of the visual field, since he had observed 90% of the early glaucomatous changes were within these 25°.

Multiple types of scotomas form inside Bjerrum's area, typically in patients with open-angle glaucoma.

Of particular note is the arcuate scotoma (also known as the Bjerrums scotoma). It starts at the blind spot, arching over the macular area, and ends as a horizontal line nasally. The arcuate scotoma does not cross the horizontal divide of the visual field.
