= Henning Rønne =

Danish ophthalmologist

Henning Rønne (25 May 1878 – 28 September 1947) was a Danish ophthalmologist.

He studied medicine at the University of Copenhagen, where he graduated with an M.B. in 1903. Later he became an assistant to Jannik Petersen Bjerrum (1851-1920), with whom he performed important studies in campimetry. In 1910 he earned his medical doctorate, and in 1931 became a professor of ophthalmology at the university.

Henning Rønne specialized in the pathological anatomy of the eye, and is remembered for campimetric studies involving the eyes' visual field. He also performed investigations involving the primary visual centres of the midbrain. His name is lent to the eponymous "Rønne nasal step", defined as a nasal visual field defect that is considered a pathognomonic sign of glaucoma.
