= Thomas–Fermi screening =

Concept in condensed matter physics

Thomas–Fermi screening is a theoretical approach to calculate the effects of electric field screening by electrons in a solid. It is a special case of the more general Lindhard theory; in particular, Thomas–Fermi screening is the limit of the Lindhard formula when the wavevector (the reciprocal of the length-scale of interest) is much smaller than the Fermi wavevector, i.e. the long-distance limit. It is named after Llewellyn Thomas and Enrico Fermi.

The Thomas–Fermi wavevector (in Gaussian-cgs units) is
$$k_0^2 = 4\pi e^2 \frac{\partial n}{\partial \mu},$$
where μ is the chemical potential (Fermi level), n is the electron concentration and e is the elementary charge.

For the example of semiconductors that are not too heavily doped, the charge density n ∝ e^{μ / k_{B}T}, where k_{B} is Boltzmann constant and T is temperature. In this case,
$$k_0^2 = \frac{4\pi e^2 n}{k_{\rm B} T},$$

i.e. 1/k_{0} is given by the familiar formula for Debye length. In the opposite extreme, in the low-temperature limit T = 0, electrons behave as quantum particles (fermions). Such an approximation is valid for metals at room temperature, and the Thomas–Fermi screening wavevector k_{TF} given in atomic units is
$$k_{\rm TF}^2= 4\left(\frac{3 n}{\pi}\right)^{1/3}.$$

If we restore the electron mass $m_e$ and the Planck constant $\hbar$, the screening wavevector in Gaussian units is $k_0^2 = k_{\rm TF}^2 (m_e/\hbar^2)$.

For more details and discussion, including the one-dimensional and two-dimensional cases, see the article on Lindhard theory.

== Derivation ==
=== Relation between electron density and internal chemical potential ===
The internal chemical potential (closely related to Fermi level, see below) of a system of electrons describes how much energy is required to put an extra electron into the system, neglecting electrical potential energy. As the number of electrons in the system increases (with fixed temperature and volume), the internal chemical potential increases. This consequence is largely because electrons satisfy the Pauli exclusion principle: only one electron may occupy an energy level and lower-energy electron states are already full, so the new electrons must occupy higher and higher energy states.

Given a Fermi gas of density $n$, the highest occupied momentum state (at zero temperature) is known as the Fermi momentum, $k_{\rm F}$.

Then the required relationship is described by the electron number density $n(\mu)$ as a function of μ, the internal chemical potential. The exact functional form depends on the system. For example, for a three-dimensional Fermi gas, a noninteracting electron gas, at absolute zero temperature, the relation is $n(\mu) \propto \mu^{3/2}$.

Proof: Including spin degeneracy,

$$n = 2 \frac{1}{(2\pi)^3} \frac{4}{3} \pi k_{\rm F}^3 \quad , \quad \mu = \frac{\hbar^2 k_{\rm F}^2}{2m}.$$

(in this context—i.e., absolute zero—the internal chemical potential is more commonly called the Fermi energy).

As another example, for an n-type semiconductor at low to moderate electron concentration, $n(\mu) \propto e^{\mu/k_{\rm B} T}$.

=== Local approximation ===
The main assumption in the Thomas–Fermi model is that there is an internal chemical potential at each point r that depends only on the electron concentration at the same point r. This behaviour cannot be exactly true because of the Heisenberg uncertainty principle. No electron can exist at a single point; each is spread out into a wavepacket of size ≈ 1 / k_{F}, where k_{F} is the Fermi wavenumber, i.e. a typical wavenumber for the states at the Fermi surface. Therefore, it cannot be possible to define a chemical potential at a single point, independent of the electron density at nearby points.

Nevertheless, the Thomas–Fermi model is likely to be a reasonably accurate approximation as long as the potential does not vary much over lengths comparable or smaller than 1 / k_{F}. This length usually corresponds to a few atoms in metals.

=== Electrons in equilibrium, nonlinear equation ===
Finally, the Thomas–Fermi model assumes that the electrons are in equilibrium, meaning that the total chemical potential is the same at all points. (In electrochemistry terminology, "the electrochemical potential of electrons is the same at all points". In semiconductor physics terminology, "the Fermi level is flat".) This balance requires that the variations in internal chemical potential are matched by equal and opposite variations in the electric potential energy. This gives rise to the "basic equation of nonlinear Thomas–Fermi theory":
$$\rho^{\text{induced}}(\mathbf{r}) = -e[n(\mu_0+e\phi(\mathbf{r})) - n(\mu_0)]$$
where n(μ) is the function discussed above (electron density as a function of internal chemical potential), e is the elementary charge, r is the position, and $\rho^{\text{induced}}(\mathbf{r})$ is the induced charge at r. The electric potential $\phi$ is defined in such a way that $\phi(\mathbf{r})=0$ at the points where the material is charge-neutral (the number of electrons is exactly equal to the number of ions), and similarly μ_{0} is defined as the internal chemical potential at the points where the material is charge-neutral.

=== Linearization, dielectric function ===
If the chemical potential does not vary too much, the above equation can be linearized:
$$\rho^{\text{induced}}(\mathbf{r}) \approx -e^2\frac{\partial n}{\partial \mu} \phi(\mathbf{r})$$
where $\partial n/\partial \mu$ is evaluated at μ_{0} and treated as a constant.

This relation can be converted into a wavevector-dependent dielectric function: (in cgs-Gaussian units)
$$\varepsilon(\mathbf{q}) = 1 + \frac{k_0^2}{q^2}$$
where
$$k_0 = \sqrt{4\pi e^2 \frac{\partial n}{\partial \mu}}.$$
At long distances (q → 0), the dielectric constant approaches infinity, reflecting the fact that charges get closer and closer to perfectly screened as you observe them from further away.

== Example: A point charge ==
If a point charge Q is placed at r = 0 in a solid, what field will it produce, taking electron screening into account?

One seeks a self-consistent solution to two equations:

- The Thomas–Fermi screening formula gives the charge density at each point r as a function of the potential $\phi(\mathbf{r})$ at that point.
- The Poisson equation (derived from Gauss's law) relates the second derivative of the potential to the charge density.

For the nonlinear Thomas–Fermi formula, solving these simultaneously can be difficult, and usually there is no analytical solution. However, the linearized formula has a simple solution (in cgs-Gaussian units):
$$\phi(\mathbf{r}) = \frac{Q}{r} e^{-k_0r}$$
With k_{0} = 0 (no screening), this becomes the familiar Coulomb's law.

Note that there may be dielectric permittivity in addition to the screening discussed here; for example due to the polarization of immobile core electrons. In that case, replace Q by Q/ε, where ε is the relative permittivity due to these other contributions.

== Fermi gas at arbitrary temperature ==
Effective temperature for Thomas–Fermi screening. The approximate form is explained in the article, and uses the power p=1.8.

For a three-dimensional Fermi gas (noninteracting electron gas), the screening wavevector $k_0$ can be expressed as a function of both temperature and Fermi energy $E_{\rm F}$. The first step is calculating the internal chemical potential $\mu$, which involves the inverse of a Fermi–Dirac integral,
$$\frac{\mu}{k_{\rm B}T} = F_{1/2}^{-1}\left[ {2\over{3\Gamma(3/2)}}\left(\frac{E_{\rm F}}{k_{\rm B}T}\right)^{3/2} \right].$$

We can express $k_0$ in terms of an effective temperature $T_{\rm eff}$: $k_0^2=4\pi e^2 n / k_{\rm B} T_{\rm eff}$, or $k_{\rm B}T_{\rm eff}=n\partial\mu/\partial n$. The general result for $T_{\rm eff}$ is
$${T_{\rm eff} \over T} = {4\over3\Gamma(1/2)} {(E_{\rm F}/k_{\rm B}T)^{3/2} \over F_{-1/2}(\mu/k_{\rm B}T)}.$$
In the classical limit $k_{\rm B}T\gg E_{\rm F}$, we find $T_{\rm eff}=T$, while in the degenerate limit $k_{\rm B}T\ll E_{\rm F}$ we find
$$k_{\rm B}T_{\rm eff}=(2/3)E_{\rm F}.$$
A simple approximate form that recovers both limits correctly is
$$k_{\rm B}T_{\rm eff}=\left[ (k_{\rm B}T)^p + (2E_{\rm F}/3)^p \right]^{1/p},$$
for any power $p$. A value that gives decent agreement with the exact result for all $k_{\rm B}T / E_{\rm F}$ is $p = 1.8$, which has a maximum relative error of < 2.3%.

In the effective temperature given above, the temperature is used to construct an effective classical model. However, this form of the effective temperature does not correctly recover the specific heat and most other properties of the finite-$T$ electron fluid even for the non-interacting electron gas. It does not of course attempt to include electron-electron interaction effects. A simple form for an effective temperature which correctly recovers all the density-functional properties of even the interacting electron gas, including the pair-distribution functions at finite $T$, has been given using the classical map hyper-netted-chain (CHNC) model of the electron fluid. That is
$$\frac{T_{\rm eff}}{E_{\rm F}} = \left( \frac{T^2}{E^2_{\rm F}} + \frac{T^2_q}{E^2_{\rm F}}\right)^{1/2}$$
where the quantum temperature $T_q$ is defined as:
$$\frac{T_q}{E_{\rm F}} = \frac{1}{a + b\sqrt{r_{\rm s}} + c r_{\rm s}}$$
where a = 1.594, b = −0.3160, c = 0.0240. Here $r_{\rm s}$ is the Wigner–Seitz radius corresponding to a sphere in atomic units containing one electron. That is, if $n$ is the number of electrons in a unit volume using atomic units where the unit of length is the Bohr, viz., 5.29177×10^{−9} cm, then
$$r_{\rm s} = \left(\frac{3}{4\pi n}\right)^{1/3}.$$
For a dense electron gas, e.g., with $r_{\rm s}\approx 1$ or less, electron-electron interactions become negligible compared to the Fermi energy, then, using a value of $r_{\rm s}$ close to unity, we see that the CHNC effective temperature at $T=0$ approximates towards the form $2E_{\rm F}/3$. Other mappings for the 3D case, and similar formulae for the effective temperature have been given for the classical map of the 2-dimensional electron gas as well.

== See also ==
- Thomas–Fermi equation
- Friedel oscillations
- Bardeen–Pines interaction
