= Kirstine Meyer =

Danish physicist (1861–1941)

Kirstine Bjerrum Meyer
- Born: Kirstine Bjerrum; 12 October 1861; Skærbæk, Denmark
- Died: 28 September 1941 (aged 79); Hellerup, Denmark
- Education: University of Copenhagen
- Occupation: physicist
- Known for: First Danish woman to earn a doctorate in natural sciences
- Spouse: Adolph Constantin Meyer (1854-1896)
- Children: Johannes (son)
- Parents: Niels Janniksen Bjerrum (1826-1880) (father); Christiane Degn (1826-1877) (mother)

Kirstine Bjerrum Meyer (12 October 1861 – 28 September 1941) was a Danish physicist and was the first woman from her country to earn a doctorate in natural sciences.

== Biography ==
Kirstine Bjerrum was born in Skærbæk, Denmark and died in Hellerup. She was the daughter of Niels Janniksen Bjerrum (1826-1880) and Christiane Degn (1826-1877).

She moved to Copenhagen at the age of 18, where she lived with her elder brother, ophthalmologist Jannik Petersen Bjerrum (1851–1920). In 1885, she married mathematician Adolph Constantin Meyer (1854-1896) and took his surname. Following the death of her husband in 1896, she became the sole parent of the couple's young son Johannes.

In 1882, Kirstine Meyer had taken a teacher's degree from N. Zahles Skole. In 1885, she began her studies at the University of Copenhagen. In 1893, she graduated with a Master's Degree in physics. She was associated with the school from 1885 to 1909 and then continued as a censor at N. Zahles Skole for a number of years. From 1892-93 she was also a substitute at the boys' school Metropolitanskolen.

She was a high school teacher for many years, working on her education and research in physics at the same time. She won the Gold Medal of the Royal Danish Academy of Science and Letters in 1899, for a paper examining whether there exists a general equation of state for all fluid bodies, Om overensstemmende Tilstande hos Stofferne. She received her Ph.D. in physics from the University of Copenhagen in 1909, becoming the first Danish woman to earn a doctorate in natural sciences. Her dissertation, Temperaturbegrebets Udvikling gennem Tiderne (The Development of the Temperature Concept through Time), was an in-depth treatment of the history of the concept of temperature.

In 1902, Meyer founded Fysisk Tidsskrift, the Danish journal of physics. She was its editor until 1913. In 1925, she was awarded the Tagea Brandt Rejselegat travel scholarship.

== Awards and honors ==
- 1899, Scientific Society Gold Medal
- 1920, Gold Medal of Merit
- 1925, Tagea Brandts Travel Grant

On 9 December 1986, DSB (the Danish railway company) named the newly delivered electric locomotive, Litra EA 3007, Kirstine Meyer.

== See also ==
- Timeline of women in science
