= Kenneth Fabricius =

Danish footballer (born 1981)

Personal information
- Full name: Kenneth Fabricius
- Date of birth: 7 November 1981 (age 45)
- Place of birth: Skærbæk, Denmark
- Height: 1.82 m (6 ft 0 in)
- Position: Striker

Youth career
- Bredebro IF
- Skærbæk BK

Senior career*
| Years | Team | Apps | (Gls) |
| 2000–2004 | Silkeborg | 44 | (9) |
| 2004–2006 | Viborg | 37 | (6) |
| 2006–2014 | SønderjyskE | 127 | (23) |
| 2013–2014 | Esbjerg fB (loan) | 15 | (0) |
| 2014–2015 | Middelfart | ? | (?) |
- * Club domestic league appearances and goals as of 12 August 2015

Kenneth Fabricius (born 3 November 1981) is a Danish former professional footballer. He played as a striker.

Fabricius started playing for Silkeborg IF in 2000, and signed his first full-time professional contract with the club in 2002. In July 2004, Fabricius moved to Viborg FF, where he played for two years, before moving to SønderjyskE in the summer 2006.
