= Marius Tscherning =

Danish ophthalmologist (1854–1939)

Marius Hans Erik Tscherning (11 December 1854, in Østrup near Odense – 1 September 1939) was a Danish ophthalmologist.

Tscherning first studied with Peter Ludvig Panum. Then he studied ophthalmology under Edmund Hansen Grut (1831–1907) in Copenhagen. Later Tscherning became an adjunct director at the ophthalmological laboratory at the Sorbonne in Paris. Tscherning spent 25 years at the Sorbonne, where he worked closely with Louis Émile Javal (1839–1907). In 1910 he returned to Denmark as a professor at the University of Copenhagen and head of the ophthalmic department at the Rigshospitalet.

Tscherning is remembered for contributions made in optical physiology. He conducted research of entoptic phenomenon, Purkinje images, the etiology of myopia, and Listing's law of ocular movement. He discovered the phenomenon of monocular rivalry in which two superimposed images fluctuate in clarity or visibility. He also designed an ophthalmophacometer, a device used to measure changes that happen in the front and back curvatures of the lens during accommodation.

He is probably best known for his theory regarding the mechanism of accommodation, of which he disagreed with the accommodation theory proposed by Hermann von Helmholtz (1821–1894). Tscherning believed that accommodation occurred through an increase of zonular pressure at the lens equator with contraction of the ciliary muscle, and therefore a bulging of the lens in accommodation was created by compression rather than by passive dilatation. Furthermore, he stated that during accommodation, while the central part of the anterior surface of the lens is bulged, the peripheral portion of the lens is flattened.

Tscherning was the author of over 100 scientific articles, including a book titled Optique physiologique, published in 1898 in Paris by Garré and Naud, and was later translated into English (Physiologic optics), and Hermann von Helmholtz et la Théorie de l´Accommodation, Paris 1909 Octave Doin, ("Hermann von Helmholtz and the Theory of Accommodation") which was critical to Helmholtz's work on the same subject, published in the Graefe's Archiv (volume 1, 1854). In 1894 he published Œuvres ophthalmologiques de Thomas Young ("Ophthalmological oeuvres of Thomas Young").

== Associated eponym ==
- "Tscherning's ellipse": A term used in corrective lens design. A graphical representation of the front surface power as a function of total lens power in best-form lenses.
