= Edmund Hansen Grut =

Danish ophthalmologist

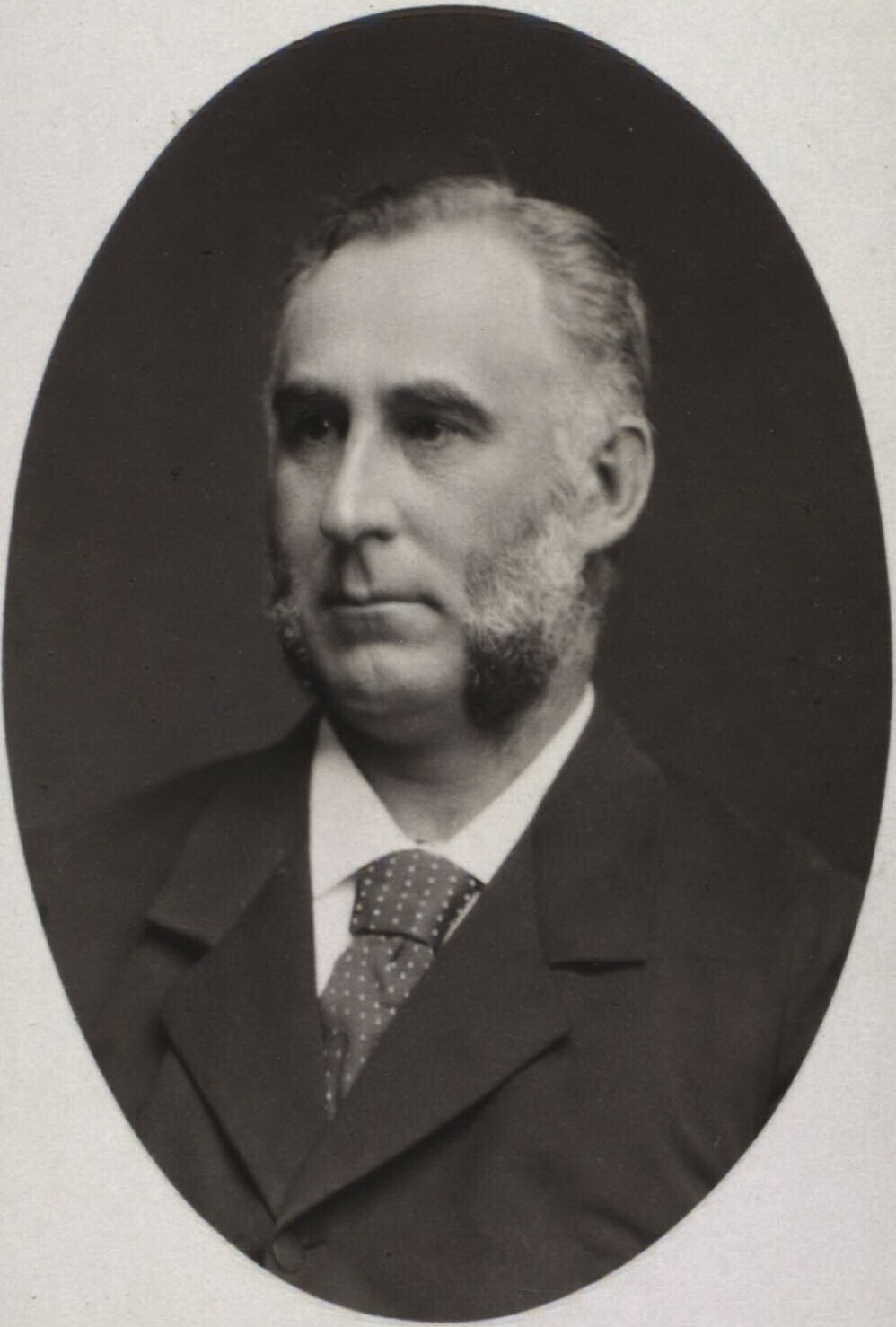
Image of Edmund Grut

Edmund Hansen Grut (15 January 1831 – 13 June 1907) was a Danish ophthalmologist born in Copenhagen.

In 1857 he earned his medical doctorate at the University of Copenhagen, and afterwards traveled to Berlin, where he studied with Albrecht von Graefe (1828-1870). In 1863 he opened an eye clinic at Nørregade, Copenhagen, and in 1873 founded an ophthalmic clinic at Havnegade (Harbour Street), not far from the University Hospital.

By 1880, the Havnegade clinic had 19 beds for patients, and on the average performed around 100 cataract surgeries per year. It was also a centre of training for ophthalmology students, where men such as Jannik Petersen Bjerrum (1851-1920), Marius Tscherning (1854-1939) and Gordon Norrie (1855-1941) worked as assistants. In 1882 Grut became a lecturer at the university, and in 1888 became the first professor of ophthalmology in Denmark. For a period of time he was editor-in-chief of the periodical Nordisk Oftalmologisk Tidsskrift.
