= Jannik Petersen Bjerrum =

Danish ophthalmologist (1851–1920)

Jannik Petersen Bjerrum (26 December 1851 – 2 July 1920) was a Danish ophthalmologist who was a native of Skærbæk, a town in the southernmost part of Jutland. In 1864 Skærbæk became part of Germany due to consequences of the Second Schleswig War.

In 1876 he received his medical doctorate from the University of Copenhagen, and in 1879 became an assistant to Edmund Hansen Grut (1831-1907) at the Havnegade eye clinic. After Grut's retirement in 1896, he became director of the clinic, as well as being the second professor of ophthalmology at the University of Copenhagen, a position he would maintain until his retirement in 1910.

Bjerrum made contributions regarding pathogenetic research of glaucoma, and performed extensive investigations involving campimetry. He was interested in the correlation between visual perception of form and the resolving power in localized regions of the retina. He was particularly focused on the subtleties of the central 30° of the visual field rather than the standard perimetry tests that many of his contemporaries favored.

As a result of his campimetric tests he discovered a small glaucomatous scotoma that was to become known as a "Bjerrum scotoma", which is a visual field defect that goes by several other names, such as "sickle scotoma", "arcuate scotoma" or "scimitar scotoma". Other eponyms named after Bjerrum include:

- Bjerrum tangent screen: Screen used to assess the central 30° of the visual field.
- Bjerrum's area: An arcuate region that extends above and below the blind spot to between 10° and 20° of fixation point.

After Bjerrum's retirement in 1910, his work in campimetry was continued by his assistant, Henning Rønne (1878-1947).

Jannik Petersen Bjerrum was the father of the chemist Niels Bjerrum and the brother of physicist Kirstine Meyer.

His grandson Jannik Bjerrum (1909 – 1992), the son of Niels Bjerrum, was also a professor of chemistry at the University of Copenhagen. He was amongst the nominated candidates for the Nobel Prize in Chemistry in 1965 with Gerold Karl Schwarzenbach and Lars Gunnar Sillén.
