= Niels Bjerrum =

Danish chemist (1879–1958)

Niels Janniksen Bjerrum (11 March 1879 – 30 September 1958) was a Danish chemist.

Niels Bjerrum was the son of ophthalmologist Jannik Petersen Bjerrum, and started to study at the University of Copenhagen in 1897. He received his Master's degree in 1902 and his Doctor's degree in 1908, and did research in coordination complex chemistry under Sophus Mads Jørgensen. He became a docent in 1912, and in 1914 he became a professor of chemistry at the Royal Agricultural College (Landbohøjskolen) in Copenhagen, as successor of Odin Tidemand Christensen. He stayed on this post until his retirement in 1949, and from 1939 to 1946 he was also the Director of the College.

Importantly, Bjerrum introduced the concept of three forms of molecular energy, translational, vibrational and rotational which was important in understanding vibrational spectroscopy. He is also noted for the theory behind the Bjerrum length, and the Bjerrum plot. Bjerrum also performed some of the first research on the measurement of soil acidity.

His son Jannik Bjerrum (1909–1992) also became a chemist and was active in the area of complex chemistry. Jannik Bjerrum with Gerold Karl Schwarzenbach and Lars Gunnar Sillén were amongst the nominated candidates for the Nobel Prize in Chemistry in 1965.

== Contribution to the Bohr Model of the atom ==
Bjerrum worked with Nernst in Berlin and contributed to chemical physics in four papers (1911–1914). The subject of the papers is the kinetic and quantum theories through absorption measurements in the infrared to elucidate the constitution and the optical and thermal properties of matter. He advanced the studies of specific heat that had been made for solids by Albert Einstein, Walther Nernst, and Lindemann. He showed the connection of specific heats and the spectrum as required by the quantum theory. Using the quantum hypothesis, the infrared absorption spectra of water vapor were shown to link to the line broadening caused by molecular rotational frequencies that vary discontinuously and to radiating atoms that do not rotate. This phenomenon was mentioned by Niels Bohr as contributing greatly to his 1913 model of the atom because it provided agreement with specific heat investigations which suggested that the rotational energy of atoms must be very small.

== Contribution to electrolytes theory ==
Between 1916 and 1926 he investigated the properties of electrolytic solutions in regards to their dissociation and association in German journals like Z. anorg. allgem. Chem. (1918, 1920) and Ergebnisse der exakten Naturwissenschaften (1926). He also published in the British journal Transactions of the Faraday Society (1927).

He introduced the quantity osmotic coefficient in relation to non-ideal solutions of electrolytes.

== See also ==
- Bjerrum length
- Bjerrum plot
