= Bjerrum length =

Comparative measure of electrostatic and thermal energy

The Bjerrum length (after Danish chemist Niels Bjerrum 1879–1958) is the separation at which the electrostatic interaction between two elementary charges is comparable in magnitude to the thermal energy scale, $k_\text{B} T$, where $k_\text{B}$ is the Boltzmann constant and $T$ is the absolute temperature in kelvins. This length scale arises naturally in discussions of electrostatic, electrodynamic and electrokinetic phenomena in electrolytes, polyelectrolytes and colloidal dispersions.

In standard units, the Bjerrum length is given by
$$\lambda_\text{B} = \frac{e^2}{4\pi \varepsilon_0 \varepsilon_r \  k_\text{B} T},$$
where $e$ is the elementary charge, $\varepsilon_r$ is the relative dielectric constant of the medium and $\varepsilon_0$ is the vacuum permittivity. For water at room temperature ($T \approx 293 \text{ K}$), $\varepsilon_r \approx 80$, so that $\lambda_\text{B} \approx 0.71 \text{ nm}$.

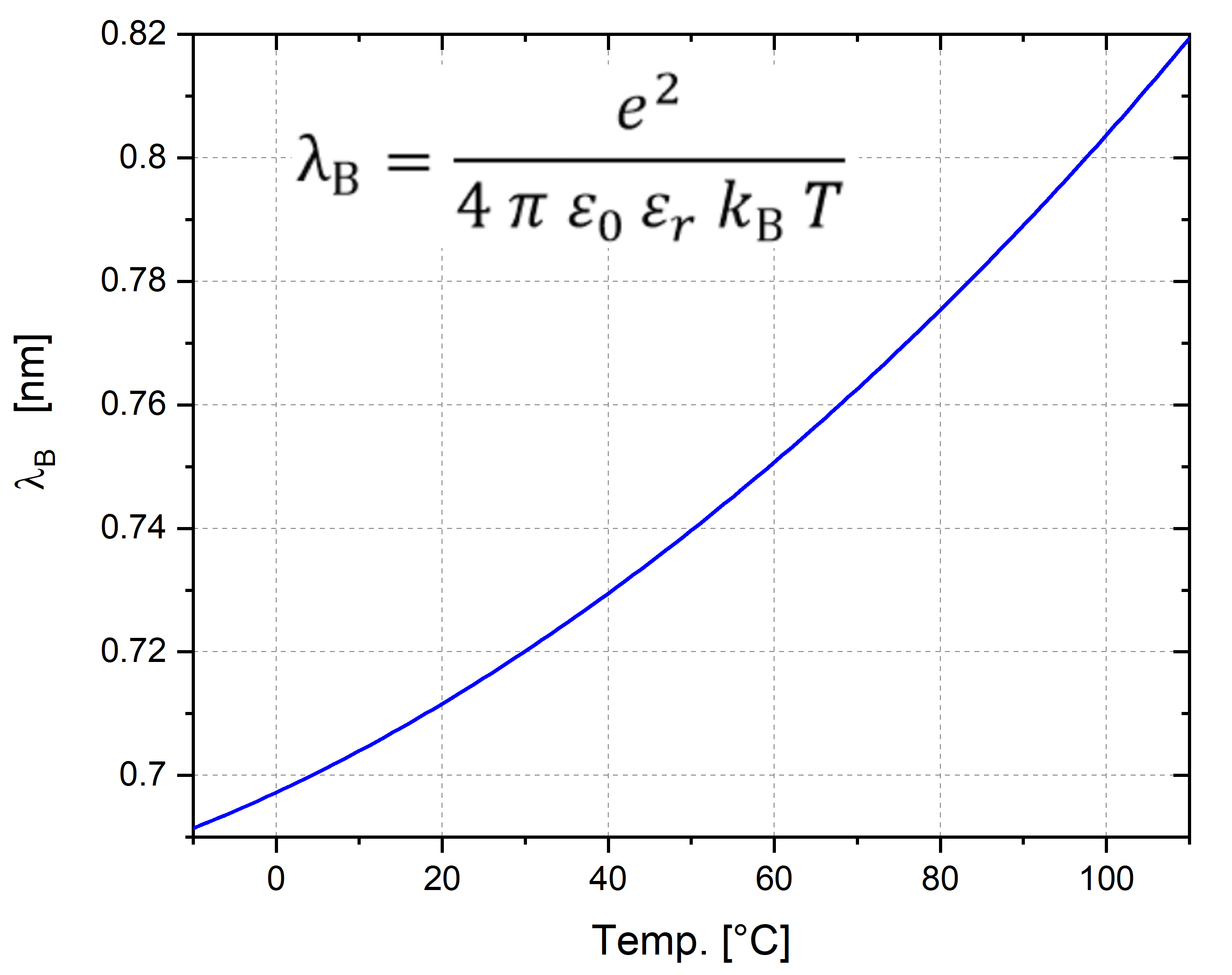
Bjerrum length in water calculated as a function of temperature.

In Gaussian units, $4\pi\varepsilon_0 = 1$ and the Bjerrum length has the simpler form
$$\lambda_\text{B} = \frac{e^2}{\varepsilon_r k_\text{B} T}.$$

The relative permittivity ε_{r} of water decreases so strongly with temperature that the product (ε_{r}·T) decreases. Therefore, in spite of the (1/T) relation, the Bjerrum length λ_{B} increases with temperature, as shown in the graph above.

== See also ==
- Debye length
- Debye–Hückel equation
- Shielding effect
- Screening effect
- Electrical double layer, (EDL)
- Brownian motion
