= Metallogels =

One-dimensional nanostructured materials

Metallogels are one-dimensional nanostructured materials, which constitute a growing class in the supramolecular chemistry field. Non-covalent interactions, such as hydrophobic interactions, π-π interactions, and hydrogen bonding, are among the responsible forces for the formation of those gels from small molecules. However, the main driving force for the formation of a metallogel is the metal-ligand coordination. Once the structure has been established, it resists gravitational force when inverted.

== Synthesis Method ==
Since the properties of gels depend on the type of non-covalent interactions involved, the metal-ligand interaction provides not only thermodynamic stability, but also kinetic lability. The general method for synthesizing gels is to heat the solution, which contains the metal ion being used and investigated, along with the ligand that will form the metallogel around it, as well as any other compounds used to create the appropriate conditions for the reaction to proceed well, until all added solids (depending on the type of gel prepared) are dissolved in the solvent used, and then cooling it down until the gels are self-assembled and properly formed. However, this method has not shown favorable results with the additions of several transition metals, along with the use of lanthanides, in an acetonitrile nitrile solution of the ligand. In these studies, the ligand used is a 2,6-Bis(1′-alkylbenzimidazolyl)pyridine, due to its commercial abundance and the wide variety of synthetic pathways that allow the functionalization of this ligand, and therefore the chemical tuning of the metallogel. Therefore, under controlled heating and cooling conditions, the addition of a source of transition metals to the solution containing the ligand, along with lanthanide ions yielded stable gels, who have passed the inversion test. Self-assembling occurs from the influence of non-covalent interactions, as depicted in figure1. These linear, self-assembling compounds can continue to self-assemble forming columnar, helical structures that further aggregate to form bundles of fibers.

Another approach to form gels as functional nanomaterials, is the bottom up method used in subcomponent self-assembly. This method aims to save resources, shorten the time of synthesis, and offer a wider range of gels by the quick exchange of one of the reaction components.

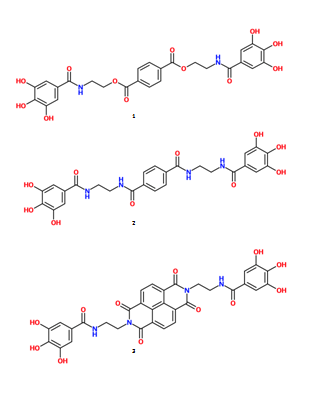

== Examples ==
Although the synthesis method generally is the same, relying on the self-assembly of small molecules in the appropriate conditions, the metallogels differ mainly in the metal ion used, which directly influences their functions, chemical, optic, and electronic properties. Among numerous metal ions that are used, gold ions have been investigated for their wide variety of foreseen applications, as discussed in the applications section. They are further divided into two categories, based on the type of solvent used during the synthesis process. Gold Organometallogelators which are formed by Au(I) in trinuclear gold(I) pyrazolate complexes with long akyl chains, which appears as a red-luminescent organogel. Gold Hydrometallogelators are made of glutathione and Au (III), which appear as a transparent gel.

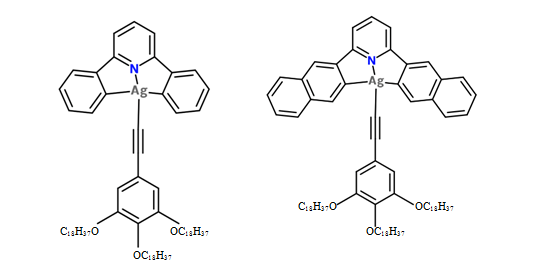
Firgure 2. Examples of Silver Organometallogelators

Silver metal ions also show properties of self-assembly, since they have high affinity to bind nitrogen, which can act as the driving force to form stable supramolecular structures.

However, copper ions have a promiscuous nature that allows them to bind to a variety of ligands, which readily form stable metallogels with tunable properties, widening the scope of their applications. Bipyridines were among the most important ligands, since the formation of those metallogels can lead to research about the coordination of copper ions to DNA base pairs. Oxalic acid dihydrate is another important ligand, that easily forms stable structures when copper salts are added, which can be used as proton conductors. Furthermore, a bile acid–picolinic acid conjugate can form gels in solvents that are 30%-50% organic. The increased water content renders this gel more biocompatible, offering room for further investigation.

Palladium ions were among the transition metals used to form catalytic and irreversible metallogels, as well.

Figure 3. Gold Hydrometallogelators

== Applications ==
Metallogels obtain multi-responsive property to widely environmental responses. In particular, metallogels which are made of transition metals and lanthanoids are thermo-responsive, mechano-responsive, chemo-responsive, and photo-responsive. A metallogel system of Co/La shows inverse gel-sol transition when being heated to 100°C. When being heated, the orange color of solution remains unchanged suggesting the reaction of La/ligands only due to the heat. Such behavior is classified as thermo-response. Metallogels are also mechano-responsive. A system of Zn/La shows the formation of gel-like material upon addition of CH3CN as solvent followed by a gentle shake. However, this material turns into a transparent liquid after sitting for 20 seconds. As an example of a chemo-response, adding a small amount of formic acid to Zn/Eu will cause the breakdown of gel-like material as well as its mechanical stability and light-emission. Different systems of metal and lanthanoids show different emission bands on photoluminescent spectra. Co/Eu emits no band on the spectra due to presence of low energy metal of the system. Zn/La shows signal of metal-bound ligand-based at 397 nm while Zn/Eu shows signals of lanthanide metal at 581, 594, 616, 652 nm and signals of ligand at 397 nm indicating that the ligand is sensitive to metal biding.

In addition to the multi-responsive properties, gold metallogels can prove to be useful in cosmetics, food processing, and lubrication. Those gels are used in drug delivery, to trap active enzymes and bacteria inside them. Furthermore, the basis of certain technologies, producing valves, clutches, and dampers, rely on the multi-responsive nature of metallogels to electric and magnetic stimuli.

A recent study on metal organic gels involving cadmium and zinc ion shows promising results to absorb dyes, which emulates the ability of natural systems to get rid of toxic material that are difficult to decompose.
