= Sponge (disambiguation) =

Sponge is an animal of the phylum Porifera.

Sponge also commonly refers to:

- Sponge (tool), a porous material used for cleaning impervious surfaces

Sponge may also refer to:

== Arts and entertainment ==
- Sponge (band), an American rock band
- "Sponge", a song by the Brecker Brothers from the 1975 album The Brecker Bros.
- Sponge (TV program), a South Korean TV show
- "The Sponge", a 1995 episode of the sitcom Seinfeld

== People ==
=== Nicknames ===
- Dave Sapunjis (born 1967), nicknamed "The Sponge", a Canadian Football player

=== Fictional characters ===
- Private Sponge, a minor character in British TV series Dad's Army
- Aunt Sponge, a fictional character from the 1961 novel James and the Giant Peach
- Spongy, a character from the first season of Battle for Dream Island, an animated web series
- SpongeBob SquarePants (character), sometimes simply referred to as "SpongeBob"

== Other uses ==
- Metal sponges, a similar porous material
- Sponge and dough, a breadmaking method
- Sponge cake, a type of cake based on flour, sugar and eggs
- Contraceptive sponge, a method of contraception
- Gauze sponge or surgical sponge, used in surgery and medicine
- SPONGE, a 1960s-era political pressure group
- Sponge function, a class of cryptographic algorithms
- Crystalline sponges, a class of organometallic networks in chemistry
- Menger sponge, a fractal

== See also ==
- Sponger (disambiguation)
- Lists of sponges
- SpongeBob SquarePants (disambiguation)
  - SpongeBob SquarePants, animated series
- Spunge, a British ska punk band
- Ladyfinger (biscuit), or sponge finger
