= Supramolecular coordination complex =

Type of coordination complex

Supramolecular coordination complexes (SCCs) are discrete self-assembled constructs formed through highly directional and stoichiometric metal-ligand coordination bonds. They are also referred to as coordination-driven self-assemblies and belong to the class of supramolecular structures called metal-organic complexes (MOC). Transition metal ions serve as Lewis-acceptor units with preferred coordination geometries, and labile or rigid ligands serve as Lewis-donor molecules that spontaneously assemble with specific directionality, leading to different types of well-defined geometries. The different coordination-driven discrete topological architecture of SCCs is categorized as two-dimensional (2D) metallacycles and three-dimensional (3D) metallacages. SCCs allow design flexibility with precision through careful selection of the structure of metal and ligand components, along with the coordination angle to obtain a range of sizes, shapes, and topologies with different physicochemical properties. Among metallacycles triangles, rectangles, hexagons, trigonal prisms, hexagonal prisms, rhomboids, and cubes, design geometries have been reported. Whereas in 3D systems, trigonal pyramids, trigonal prisms, truncated and snub cubes, truncated tetrahedra, cuboctahedra, double squares, adamantanoids, dodecahedra are among the variety of cage geometries reported. Several design strategies or approaches have been identified and studied for the synthesis of metallacycles and metallacages, and are summarized in several reviews on SCCs.

== Distinctive features and uses ==
The distinctive feature of the SCCs is imparted by the predictable nature of metal-ligand coordination spheres and moderate bond strength, allowing dynamic flexibility or reversibility of weak non-covalent bonds and relative stability or rigidity of stronger covalent bonds, which dictate the coordination kinetics of the self-assembly process. The metal-ligand bonds have energies of (15-50 kcal/mol) compared to organic covalent bonds (approx. 60-120 kcal/mol) and the weak interactions (ca. 0.5 10 kcal/mol). The feature of kinetic reversibility due to substitutional lability of metal-ligand bonds and reactive intermediates endows the coordination-driven self-assembled architectures ability to "self-correct" to the most thermodynamically favorable product. In simpler words, transition metals have their preferred geometry (of acceptor sites), so if a rigid or flexible donor ligand coordinates in an improper orientation, the thermodynamically favored structure or closed geometry is not formed (kinetic intermediates are formed). Then the metal-ligand bonds can dissociate and reassociate "correctly" to transform into the target thermodynamic product. To ensure SCCs are free from kinetic impurities, the synthetic conditions for self-assembly must allow easy reconstruction of reactive intermediates (avoid precipitation, insolubility, or sluggishness in rectifying) en route to the energetically minimum product.

Supramolecular structures assembled through covalent bonds are hard to design procedurally, requiring step-wise addition, time-consuming to synthesize, and suffer from fairly low yields. Moderate metal-ligand bonds with carefully selected components offer greater designability and control over such synthetic self-assembly. Likewise, SCCs also overcome several challenges of supramolecular structures formed through the collection of weak non-covalent forces (H-bonding, ion-ion or ion-dipole, donor acceptor, π-π stacking, van der Waals, and hydrophilic and hydrophobic, etc., interactions) like the absence of stability to avoid disassembly in multiple environments, the absence of defect-free final structures, and the lack of directionality control to make highly complex, symmetrical or specific well-defined architectures. SCCs provide convenient, quantitative, and precise discrete structures ranging from only a few nm to several thousand cubic mm, afforded by a bottom-up synthesis strategy tunable for different applications. Such advantages of SCCs were recognized, reported, and popularized by researchers like Lehn, Raymond, Stang, Fujita, Nitschke, and several others. Among several SCC applications explored are use as molecular flasks or reaction vessels for unusual chemistries unachievable in conventional mediums, use for molecular or guest recognition, supramolecular catalysis, separation, host-guest chemistry, cavity-dictated reactions, drug delivery, diagnostic and therapeutic agents, sensing, stimuli-responsive properties, and several other applications.
