= Crystalline sponges =

Organometallic networks in chemistry

Crystalline sponges are series of organometallic networks developed by Japanese chemist Makoto Fujita. The organic small molecules are absorbed into the void space of the crystalline sponges. Since the organometallic network of crystalline sponges can interact with the small molecule substrates via non-covalent interactions, the absorption can be selective. That is, the crystalline sponge can enrich certain molecules from a mixture.

As the crystal sponges are highly organized frameworks, the structure of the whole host-guest complex can be characterized by X-ray diffraction. Because the absorbate is encapsulated in a pre-organized environment, no single crystal of the substrate is needed in the X-ray diffraction. Besides, the X-ray crystallography of liquid samples can also be conducted.

== Molecular structure and composition ==
The first crystalline sponges developed by Makoto Fujita is [(Co(NCS)_{2})_{3}(TPT)_{4}], which is an infinitely extensive framework of Co^{2+} octahedral complex. Each octahedral complex is composed of six Co(NCS) vertexes and four 2,4,6-tris(4-pyridyl)-1,3,5-triazine (TPT) ligands. Besides the basic octahedral cavity (M_{6}L_{4}), there are also two different cuboctahedral cavities (M_{12}L_{8} and M_{12}L_{24}) which can accommodate larger molecules, such as C_{60}, C_{70}.

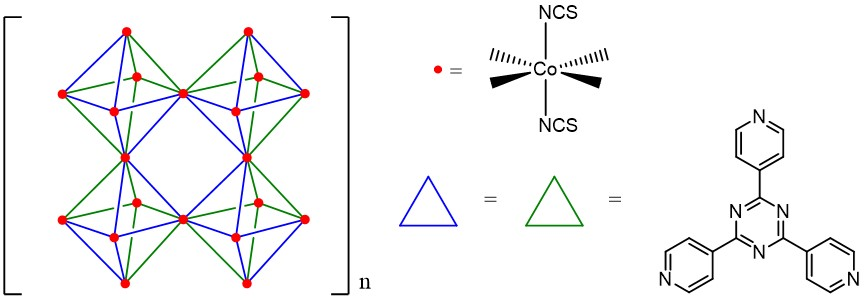
Molecular structure of first crystalline sponges [(Co(NCS)_{2})_{3}(TPT)_{4}]

In 2013, the Fujita and his team discovered that the [(ZnI_{2})_{3}(TPT)_{2}] organometallic network can also act as a crystalline sponge. Because Zn crystalline sponges are less symmetrical (C_{2}) than Co crystalline sponges, the X-ray diffraction analysis of its guest molecules is easier to be elucidated.

The Zn-based sponges also have following advantages: (1) Pores sizes are suitable for accommodating general organic compounds (5 × 8Å), (2) The distribution of TPT ligand is flat, providing better stacking opportunity of aromatic guest compounds or C—H π interaction opportunity with aliphatic guest compounds, (3) The iodine atoms and the pyridinium protons can be hydrogen bond acceptors or donors, respectively. They would enhance the interaction between the substrate and the crystalline sponges, (4) The framework of Zn-based crystalline sponge is flexible to some extent. The molecule which is a little bit larger than the sponge cavity can still be accommodated via framework expansion to adjust the pore size.

== Preparation ==
For preparation of [(Co(NCS)_{2})_{3}(TPT)_{4}] crystalline sponges, the methanol solution of Co(NCS)_{2} was added into the TPT solution in 1,2-dichlorobenzene/methanol. After 7 days, the [(Co(NCS)_{2})_{3}(TPT)_{4}] would form and can be isolated by filtration.

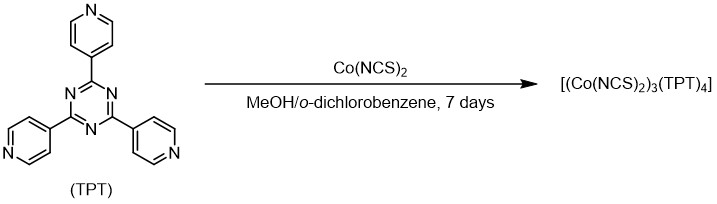
Synthesis of [(Co(NCS)_{2})_{3}(TPT)_{4}]

For preparation of [(ZnI_{2})_{3}(TPT)_{2}] crystalline sponges, the methanol solution of ZnI_{2} was added onto the top of TPT in nitrobenzene solution. After 7 days, the [(ZnI_{2})_{3}(TPT)_{2}] would form and can be isolated by filtration.

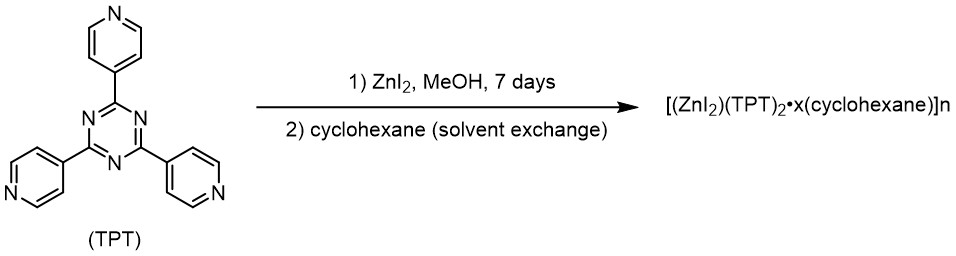
Synthesis of [(ZnI_{2})_{3}(TPT)_{2}]

Once the feedstocks were mixed, crystalline sponges would be produced via self-assembling processes, forming the thermodynamically stable organized network structures.

== Application ==
=== Extract compounds from mixture ===
The crystalline sponges can be viewed as the extension of organometallic cage compounds. They can not only accommodate guest molecules, but also provide non-covalent interactions with the guest. To exploit these properties, the Fujita group demonstrates [(Co(NCS)_{2})_{3}(TPT)_{4}] can enrich C_{70}, C_{78}, or other higher fullerenes from C_{60} mixtures as normal cage compounds did in precedent research.

=== X-ray crystallography of liquids encapsulated within the sponge framework ===
In 2013, the Fujita group rediscovered that the molecular structure of liquids can be elucidated by X-ray crystallography in the presence of [(ZnI_{2})_{3}(TPT)_{2}] crystalline sponges. The guest compounds, such as cyclohexanone, cinnamaldehyde were dropped onto the pre-made single crystal of crystalline sponges. The liquid samples would penetrate into the crystalline sponges, and occupy the sponges’ cavities. As crystalline sponges provide a well-organized structure, the guests in sponges’ cavities would also have organized distribution in the space. As a result, the structure of guest can be characterized by X-ray crystallography .

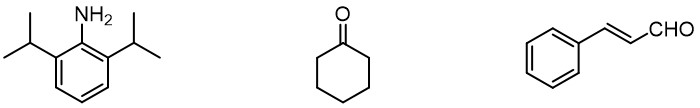
Structure of diisopropylaniline and cyclohexanone and cinnamaldehyde

Diisopropylaniline crystal structure in crystalline sponge

Cinnamaldehyde crystal structure in crystalline sponge

Cyclohexanone crystal in crystalline sponge

Some of the structures of liquid natural products which are difficult to differentiate by NMR spectroscopy can be easily characterized by crystalline sponges techniques. Elatenyne is a liquid molecule isolated from Laurencia elata, marine red algae. Due to its pseudo-C_{2} symmetry, the difference of NMR spectrum between elatenyne and its stereoisomer is hard to differentiate. However, with the crystalline sponges, the Fujita group easily elucidated the chirality in the elatenyne.

Elatenyne

Cycloelatanene A and B are a pair of diastereomers isolated from Laurencia elata. Both compounds are liquid, so the traditional X-ray diffraction analysis cannot elucidate their absolute chirality. After the crystalline sponges assisted X-ray crystallography, the Fujita group revised the chirality of C4 position reported by precedent NMR analysis.

Structures of cycloelatanene A and B
