= Salt bridge (protein) =

Combination of hydrogen and ionic bonding in chemistry

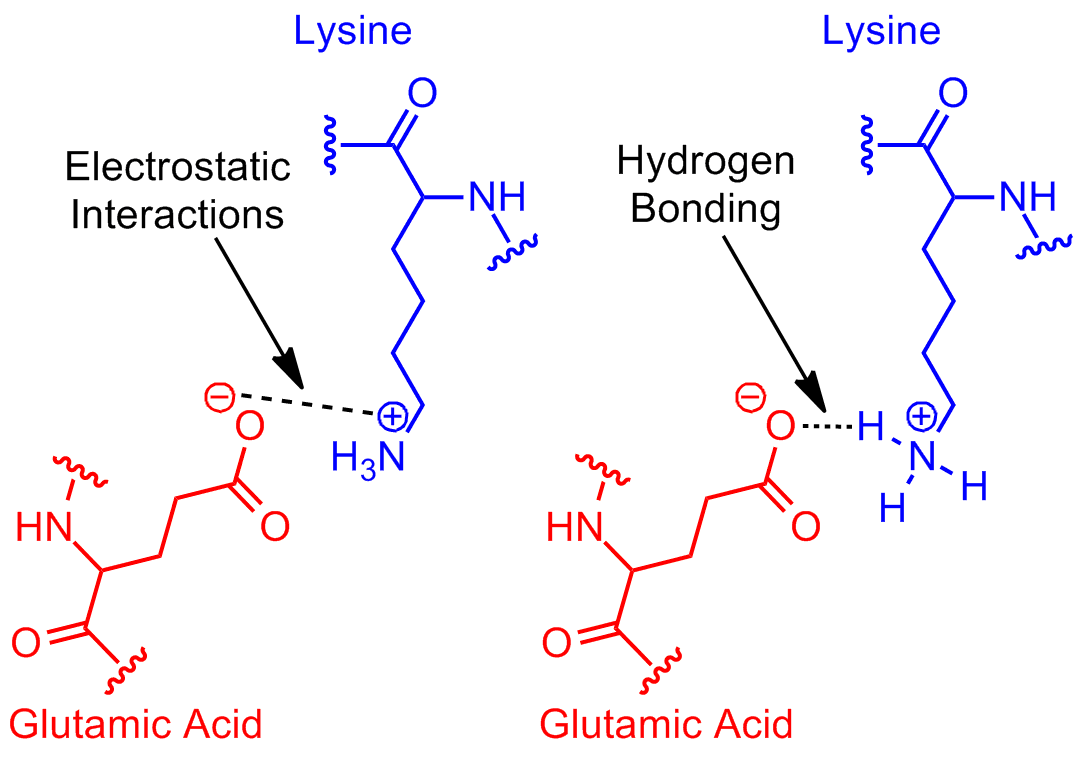
Salt bridge between amino acids glutamic acid and lysine residues demonstrating electrostatic interaction and hydrogen bonding

In chemistry, a salt bridge is a combination of two non-covalent interactions: hydrogen bonding and ionic bonding. Ion pairing is one of the most important noncovalent forces in chemistry, in biological systems, in different materials and in many applications such as ion pair chromatography. It is a most commonly observed contribution to the stability to the entropically unfavorable folded conformation of proteins. Although non-covalent interactions are known to be relatively weak interactions, small stabilizing interactions can add up to make an important contribution to the overall stability of a conformer. Not only are salt bridges found in proteins, but they can also be found in supramolecular chemistry. The thermodynamics of each are explored through experimental procedures to access the free energy contribution of the salt bridge to the overall free energy of the state.

== Salt bridges in chemical bonding ==
In water, formation of salt bridges or ion pairs is mostly driven by entropy, usually accompanied by unfavorable ΔH contributions on account of desolvation of the interacting ions upon association. Hydrogen bonds contribute to the stability of ion pairs with e.g. protonated ammonium ions, and with anions is formed by deprotonation as in the case of carboxylate, phosphate etc; then the association constants depend on the pH. Entropic driving forces for ion pairing (in absence of significant H-bonding contributions) are also found in methanol as solvent. In nonpolar solvents contact ion pairs with very high association constants are formed; in the gas phase the association energies of e.g. alkali halides reach up to 200 kJ/mol. The Bjerrum or the Fuoss equation describe ion pair association as function of the ion charges zA and zB and the dielectric constant ε of the medium; a corresponding plot of the stability ΔG vs. zAzB shows for over 200 ion pairs the expected linear correlation for a large variety of ions. Inorganic as well as organic ions display at moderate ionic strength I similar salt bridge association ΔG values around 5 to 6 kJ/mol for a 1:1 combination of anion and cation, almost independent of the nature (size, polarizability etc) of the ions. The ΔG values are additive and approximately a linear function of the charges, the interaction of e.g. a doubly charged phosphate anion with a single charged ammonium cation accounts for about 2x5 = 10 kJ/mol. The ΔG values depend on the ionic strength I of the solution, as described by the Debye–Hückel equation, at zero ionic strength one observes ΔG = 8 kJ/mol. The stabilities of the alkali-ion pairs as function of the anion charge z by can be described by a more detailed equation.

== Salt bridges found in proteins ==
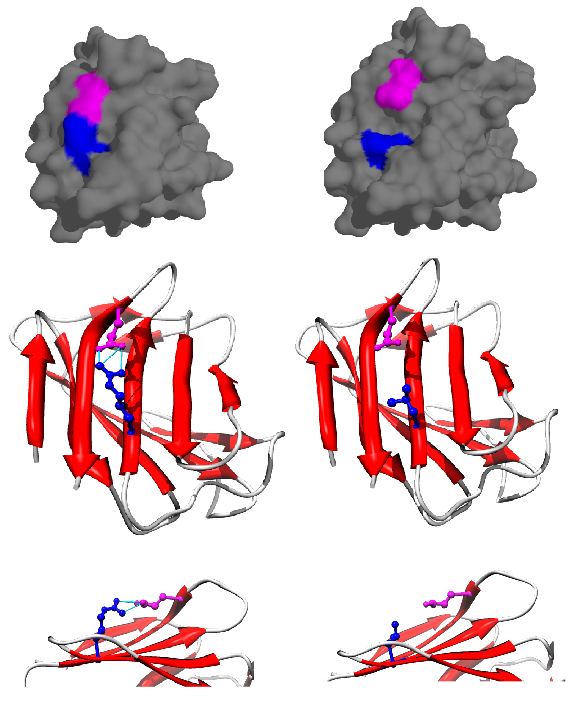
Wild type (left) and mutated (right) form of lamin A (LMNA, PDB: 1IFR). Normally, arginine 527 (blue) forms salt bridge with glutamate 537 (magenta), but R527L mutation causes loss of the complementary negative charge and structure destabilization. At the phenotype level this manifests with overlapping mandibuloacral dysplasia and progeria syndrome.

The salt bridge most often arises from the anionic carboxylate (RCOO^{−}) of either aspartic acid or glutamic acid and the cationic ammonium (RNH_{3}^{+}) from lysine or the guanidinium (RNHC(NH_{2})_{2}^{+}) of arginine. Although these are the most common, other residues with ionizable side chains such as histidine, tyrosine, and serine can also participate, depending on outside factors perturbing their pK_{a}'s. The distance between the residues participating in the salt bridge is also cited as being important. The N-O distance required is less than 4 Å (400 pm). Amino acids greater than this distance apart do not qualify as forming a salt bridge. Due to the numerous ionizable side chains of amino acids found throughout a protein, the pH at which a protein is placed is crucial to its stability.

== Salt bridges found in protein–ligand complexes ==
Salt bridges also can form between a protein and small molecule ligands. Over 1100 unique protein-ligand complexes from the Protein Databank were found to form salt bridges with their protein targets, indicating that salt bridges are frequent in drug-protein interaction. These contain structures from different enzyme classes, including hydrolase, transferases, kinases, reductase, oxidoreductase, lyases, and G protein-coupled receptors (GPCRs).

== Methods for quantifying salt bridge stability in proteins ==
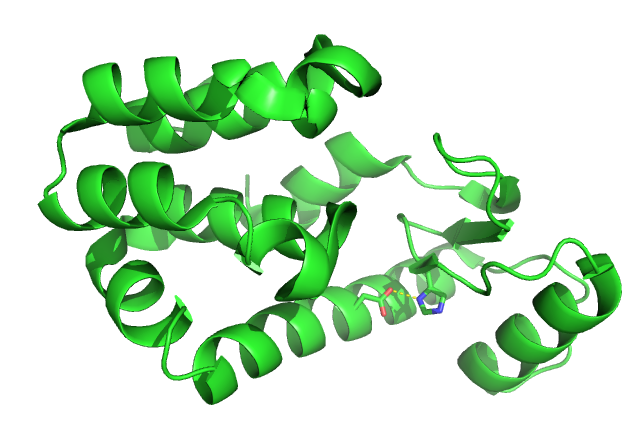
A salt bridge in T4 lysozyme between aspartic acid (Asp) at residue 70 and a histidine (His) at residue 31

The contribution of a salt bridge to the overall stability to the folded state of a protein can be assessed through thermodynamic data gathered from mutagenesis studies and nuclear magnetic resonance techniques. Using a mutated pseudo-wild-type protein specifically mutated to prevent precipitation at high pH, the salt bridge’s contribution to the overall free energy of the folded protein state can be determined by performing a point-mutation, altering and, consequently, breaking the salt bridge. For example, a salt bridge was identified to exist in the T4 lysozyme between aspartic acid (Asp) at residue 70 and a histidine (His) at residue 3. Site-directed mutagenesis with asparagine (Asn) was done obtaining three new mutants: Asp70Asn His31 (Mutant 1), Asp70 His31Asn (Mutant 2), and Asp70Asn His31Asn (Double Mutant).

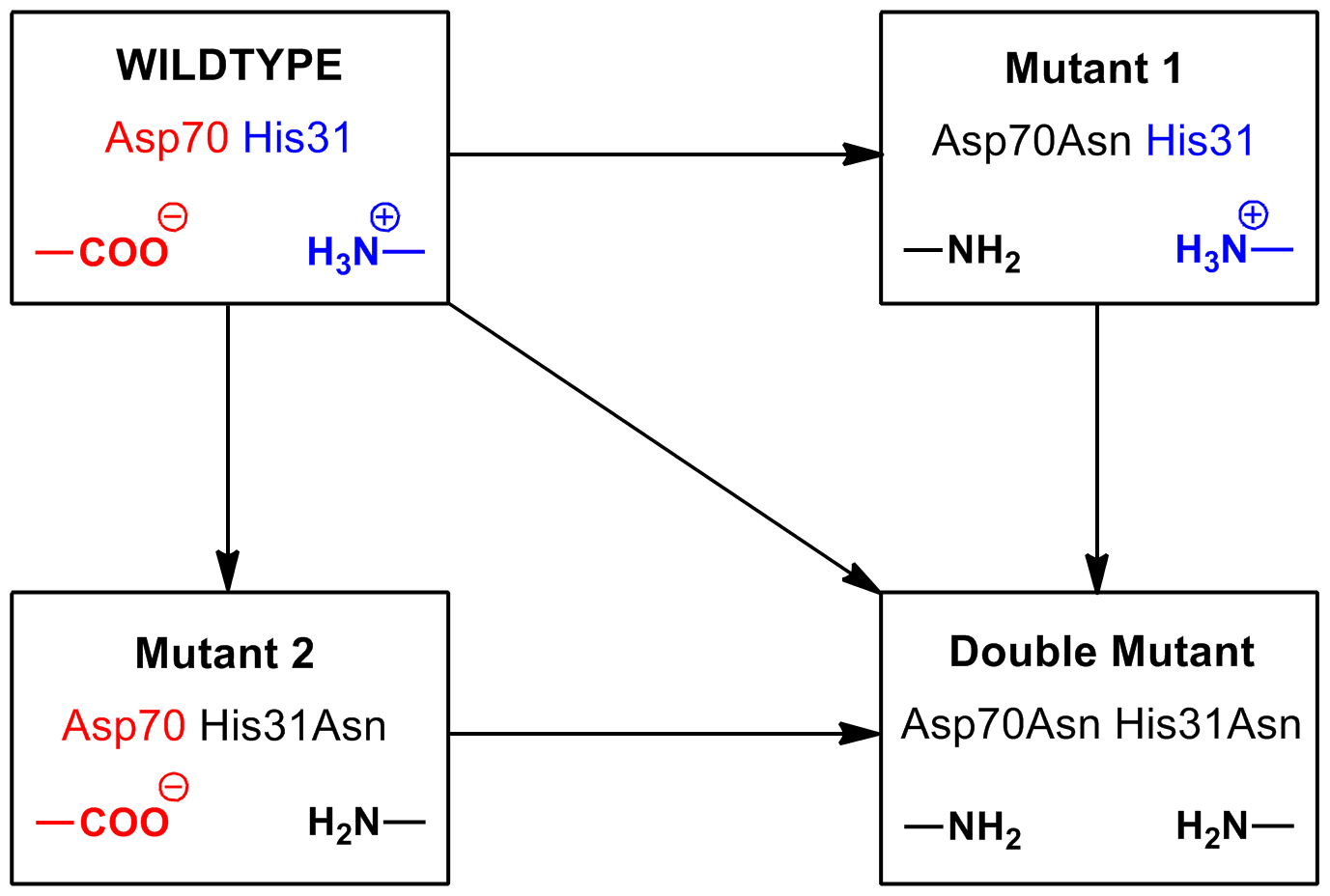
Mutagenesis of T4 lysozyme salt bridge between Asp70 and His31. (Note that His does not have an amine group but an imidazole group.)

Once the mutants have been established, two methods can be employed to calculate the free energy associated with a salt bridge. One method involves the observation of the melting temperature of the wild-type protein versus that of the three mutants. The denaturation can be monitored through a change in circular dichroism. A reduction in melting temperature indicates a reduction in stability. This is quantified through a method described by Becktel and Schellman where the free energy difference between the two is calculated through ΔTΔS. There are some issues with this calculation and can only be used with very accurate data. In the T4 lysozyme example, ΔS of the pseudo-wild-type had previously been reported at pH 5.5 so the midpoint temperature difference of 11 °C at this pH multiplied by the reported ΔS of 360 cal/(mol·K) (1.5 kJ/(mol·K)) yields a free energy change of about −4 kcal/mol (−17 kJ/mol). This value corresponds to the amount of free energy contributed to the stability of the protein by the salt bridge.

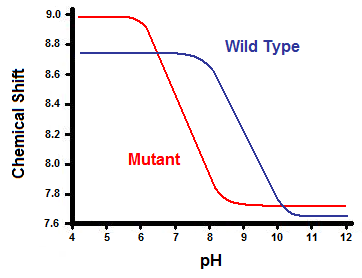
Titration curve between the wild-type (blue) and the mutant (red)

The second method utilizes nuclear magnetic resonance spectroscopy to calculate the free energy of the salt bridge. A titration is performed, while recording the chemical shift corresponding to the protons of the carbon adjacent to the carboxylate or ammonium group. The midpoint of the titration curve corresponds to the pK_{a}, or the pH where the ratio of protonated: deprotonated molecules is 1:1. Continuing with the T4 lysozyme example, a titration curve is obtained through observation of a shift in the C2 proton of histidine 31. A shift is observed in the titration curve between the wild-type and the mutant in which Asp70 is Asn. The salt bridge formed is between the deprotonated Asp70 and protonated His31. This interaction causes the shift seen in His31’s pK_{a}. In the unfolded wild-type protein, where the salt bridge is absent, His31 is reported to have a pK_{a} of 6.8 in H_{2}O buffers of moderate ionic strength. The pK_{a} of the wild-type of 9.05. This difference in pK_{a} is supported by the His31’s interaction with Asp70. To maintain the salt bridge, His31 will attempt to keep its proton as long as possible. When the salt bridge is disrupted, like in the mutant D70N, the pK_{a} shifts back to a value of 6.9, much closer to that of His31 in the unfolded state.

The difference in pK_{a} can be quantified to reflect the salt bridge’s contribution to free energy. Using Gibbs free energy: ΔG = −RT ln(K_{eq}), where R is the universal gas constant, T is the temperature in kelvins, and K_{eq} is the equilibrium constant of a reaction in equilibrium. The deprotonation of His31 is an acid equilibrium reaction with a special K_{eq} known as the acid dissociation constant, K_{a}: His31-H^{+} ⇌ His31 + H^{+}. The pK_{a} is then related to K_{a} by the following: pK_{a} = −log(K_{a}). Calculation of the free energy difference of the mutant and wild-type can now be done using the free energy equation, the definition of pK_{a}, the observed pK_{a} values, and the relationship between natural logarithms and logarithms. In the T4 lysozyme example, this approach yielded a calculated contribution of about 3 kcal/mol to the overall free energy. A similar approach can be taken with the other participant in the salt bridge, such as Asp70 in the T4 lysozyme example, by monitoring its shift in pK_{a} after mutation of His31.

A word of caution when choosing the appropriate experiment involves the location of the salt bridge within the protein. The environment plays a large role in the interaction. At high ionic strengths, the salt bridge can be completely masked since an electrostatic interaction is involved. The His31-Asp70 salt bridge in T4 lysozyme was buried within the protein. Entropy plays a larger role in surface salt bridges where residues that normally have the ability to move are constricted by their electrostatic interaction and hydrogen bonding. This has been shown to decrease entropy enough to nearly erase the contribution of the interaction. Surface salt bridges can be studied similarly to that of buried salt bridges, employing double mutant cycles and NMR titrations. Although cases exist where buried salt bridges contribute to stability, like anything else, exceptions do exist and buried salt bridges can display a destabilizing effect. Also, surface salt bridges, under certain conditions, can display a stabilizing effect. The stabilizing or destabilizing effect must be assessed on a case by case basis and few blanket statements are able to be made.
