= Cation–π interaction =

Noncovalent molecular interaction

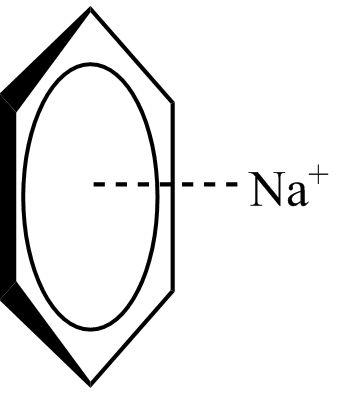
Cation–π interaction between benzene and a sodium cation.

Cation–π interaction is a noncovalent molecular interaction between the face of an electron-rich π system (e.g. benzene, ethylene, acetylene) and an adjacent cation (e.g. Li^{+}, Na^{+}). This interaction is an example of noncovalent bonding between a monopole (cation) and a quadrupole (π system). Bonding energies are significant, with solution-phase values falling within the same order of magnitude as hydrogen bonds and salt bridges. Similar to these other non-covalent bonds, cation–π interactions play an important role in nature, particularly in protein structure, molecular recognition and enzyme catalysis. The effect has also been observed and put to use in synthetic systems.

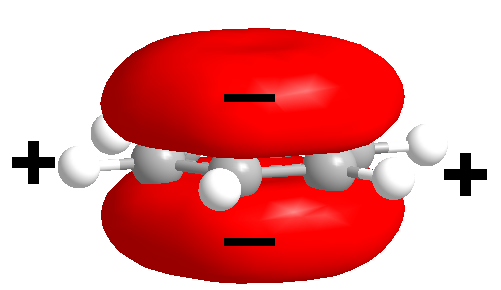
The π system above and below the benzene ring leads to a quadrupole charge distribution.

== Origin of the effect ==
Benzene, the model π system, has no permanent dipole moment, as the contributions of the weakly polar carbon–hydrogen bonds cancel due to molecular symmetry. However, the electron-rich π system above and below the benzene ring hosts a partial negative charge. A counterbalancing positive charge is associated with the plane of the benzene atoms, resulting in an electric quadrupole (a pair of dipoles, aligned like a parallelogram so there is no net molecular dipole moment). The negatively charged region of the quadrupole can then interact favorably with positively charged species; a particularly strong effect is observed with cations of high charge density.

== Nature of the cation–π interaction ==
The most studied cation–π interactions involve binding between an aromatic π system and an alkali metal or nitrogenous cation. The optimal interaction geometry places the cation in van der Waals contact with the aromatic ring, centered on top of the π face along the 6-fold axis. Studies have shown that electrostatics dominate interactions in simple systems, and relative binding energies correlate well with electrostatic potential energy.

The Electrostatic Model developed by Dougherty and coworkers describes trends in binding energy based on differences in electrostatic attraction. It was found that interaction energies of cation–π pairs correlate well with electrostatic potential above the π face of arenes: for eleven Na^{+}-aromatic adducts, the variation in binding energy between the different adducts could be completely rationalized by electrostatic differences. Practically, this allows trends to be predicted qualitatively based on visual representations of electrostatic potential maps for a series of arenes. Electrostatic attraction is not the only component of cation–π bonding. For example, 1,3,5-trifluorobenzene interacts with cations despite having a negligible quadrupole moment. While non-electrostatic forces are present, these components remain similar over a wide variety of arenes, making the electrostatic model a useful tool in predicting relative binding energies. The other "effects" contributing to binding are not well understood. Polarization, donor-acceptor and charge-transfer interactions have been implicated; however, energetic trends do not track well with the ability of arenes and cations to take advantage of these effects. For example, if induced dipole was a controlling effect, aliphatic compounds such as cyclohexane should be good cation–π partners (but are not).

The cation–π interaction is noncovalent and is therefore fundamentally different than bonding between transition metals and π systems. Transition metals have the ability to share electron density with π-systems through d-orbitals, creating bonds that are highly covalent in character and cannot be modeled as a cation–π interaction.

== Factors influencing the cation–π bond strength ==
Several criteria influence the strength of the bonding: the nature of the cation, solvation effects, the nature of the π system, and the geometry of the interaction.

=== Nature of the cation ===
From electrostatics (Coulomb's law), smaller and more positively charged cations lead to larger electrostatic attraction. Since cation–π interactions are predicted by electrostatics, it follows that cations with larger charge density interact more strongly with π systems.

The following table shows a series of Gibbs free energy of binding between benzene and several cations in the gas phase. For a singly charged species, the gas-phase interaction energy correlates with the ionic radius, $r_{\mathrm{ion}}$ (non-spherical ionic radii are approximate).

M^{+}	Li^{+}	Na^{+}	K^{+}	NH_{4}^{+}	Rb^{+}	NMe_{4}^{+}
−ΔG [kcal/mol]	38	27	19	19	16	9
$r_{\mathrm{ion}}$ [Å]	0.76	1.02	1.38	1.43	1.52	2.45

This trend supports the idea that coulombic forces play a central role in interaction strength, since for other types of bonding one would expect the larger and more polarizable ions to have greater binding energies.

=== Solvation effects ===
The nature of the solvent also determines the absolute and relative strength of the bonding. Most data on cation–π interaction is acquired in the gas phase, as the attraction is most pronounced in that case. Any intermediating solvent molecule will attenuate the effect, because the energy gained by the cation–π interaction is partially offset by the loss of solvation energy.

For a given cation–π adduct, the interaction energy decreases with increasing solvent polarity. This can be seen by the following calculated interaction energies of methylammonium and benzene in a variety of solvents.

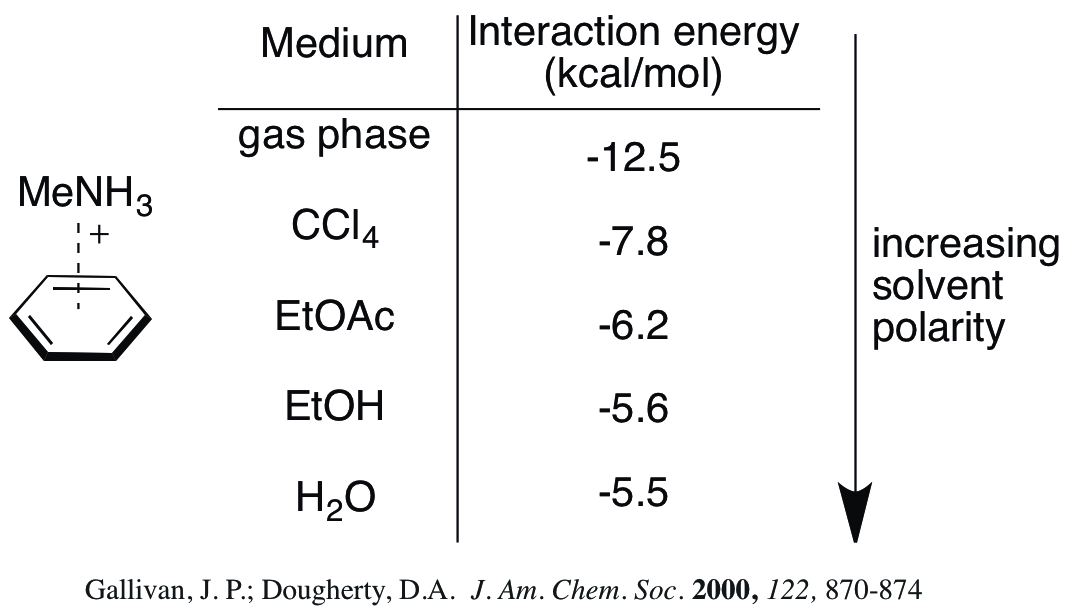
Calculated interaction energies of methylamonium and benzene in a variety of solvents

Additionally, the trade-off between solvation and the cation–π effect results in a rearrangement of the order of interaction strength for a series of cations. While in the gas phase the most densely charged cations have the strongest cation–π interaction, these ions also have a high desolvation penalty. This is demonstrated by the relative cation–π bond strengths in water for alkali metals:

$$\ce{K+ > Rb+ \gg Na+, Li+}$$

=== Nature of the π system ===
==== Quadrupole moment ====
Comparing the quadrupole moment of different arenes is a useful qualitative tool to predict trends in cation–π binding, since it roughly correlates with interaction strength. Arenes with larger quadrupole moments are generally better at binding cations.

However, a quadrupole-ion model system cannot be used to quantitatively model cation–π interactions. Such models assume point charges, and are therefore not valid given the short cation–π bond distance. In order to use electrostatics to predict energies, the full electrostatic potential surface must be considered, rather than just the quadrupole moment as a point charge.

==== Substituents on the aromatic ring ====
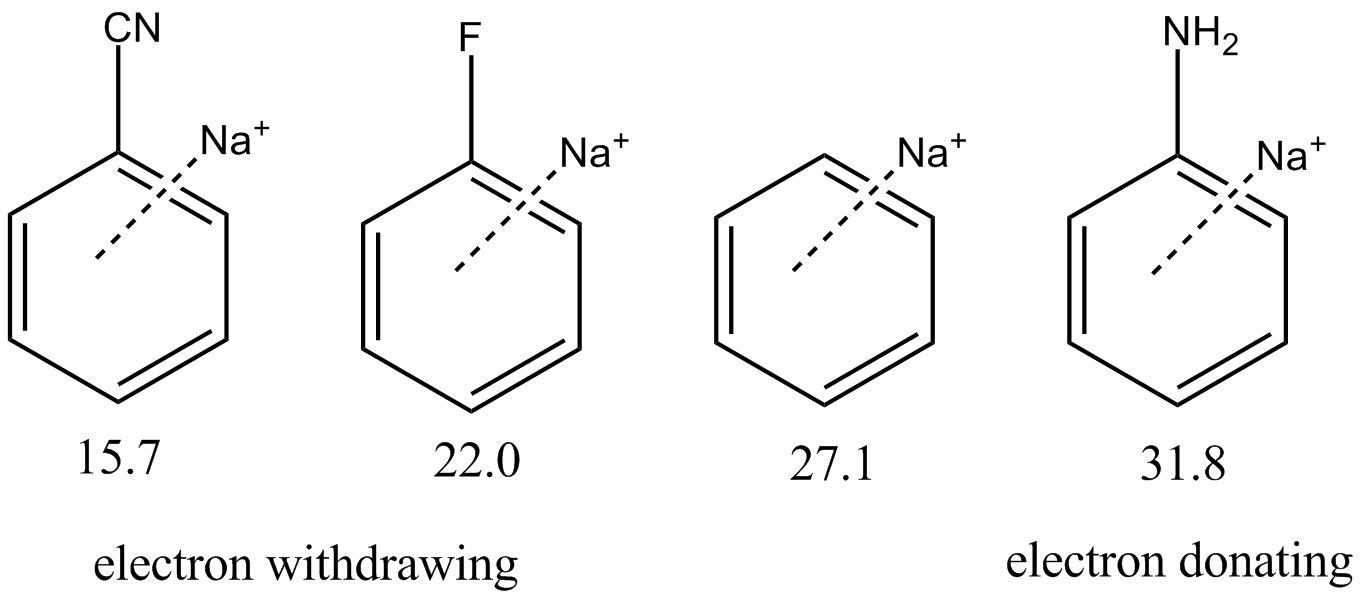
Binding energy (in kcal/mol) for Na^{+} to benzene with prototypical substituents.

The electronic properties of the substituents also influence the strength of the attraction. Electron withdrawing groups (for example, cyano −CN) weaken the interaction, while electron donating substituents (for example, amino −NH_{2}) strengthen the cation–π binding. This relationship is illustrated quantitatively in the margin for several substituents.

The electronic trends in cation–π binding energy are not quite analogous to trends in aryl reactivity. Indeed, the effect of resonance participation by a substituent does not contribute substantively to cation–π binding, despite being very important in many chemical reactions with arenes. This was shown by the observation that cation–π interaction strength for a variety of substituted arenes correlates with the σ_{meta} Hammett parameter. This parameter is meant to illustrate the inductive effects of functional groups on an aryl ring.

The origin of substituent effects in cation–π interactions has often been attributed to polarization from electron donation or withdrawal into or out of the π system. This explanation makes intuitive sense, but subsequent studies have indicated that it is flawed. Recent computational work by Wheeler and Houk strongly indicate that the effect is primarily due to direct through-space interaction between the cation and the substituent dipole. In this study, calculations that modeled unsubstituted benzene plus interaction with a molecule of "H-X" situated where a substituent would be (corrected for extra hydrogen atoms) accounted for almost all of the cation–π binding trend. For very strong pi donors or acceptors, this model was not quite able account for the whole interaction; in these cases polarization may be a more significant factor.

==== Binding with heteroaromatic systems ====
Heterocycles are often activated towards cation–π binding when the lone pair on the heteroatom is in incorporated into the aromatic system (e.g. indole, pyrrole). Conversely, when the lone pair does not contribute to aromaticity (e.g. pyridine), the electronegativity of the heteroatom wins out and weakens the cation–π binding ability.

Since several classically "electron rich" heterocycles are poor donors when it comes to cation–π binding, one cannot predict cation–π trends based on heterocycle reactivity trends. Fortunately, the aforementioned subtleties are manifested in the electrostatic potential surfaces of relevant heterocycles.

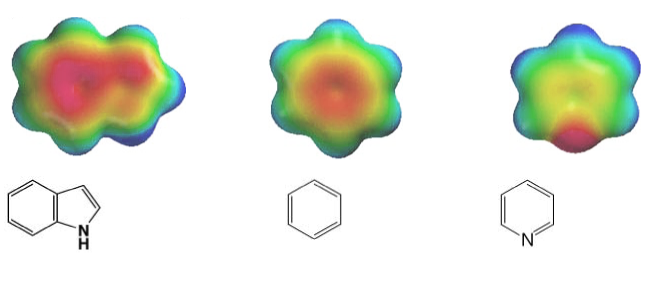

Cation–heterocycle interaction is not always a cation–π interaction; in some cases it is more favorable for the ion to be bound directly to a lone pair. For example, this is thought to be the case in pyridine-Na^{+} complexes.

=== Geometry ===
Cation–π interactions have an approximate distance dependence of 1/r^{n} where n<2. The interaction is less sensitive to distance than a simple ion-quadrupole interaction which has 1/r^{3} dependence.

A study by Sherrill and coworkers probed the geometry of the interaction further, confirming that cation–π interactions are strongest when the cation is situated perpendicular to the plane of atoms (θ = 0 degrees in the image below). Variations from this geometry still exhibit a significant interaction which weakens as θ angle approaches 90 degrees. For off-axis interactions the preferred ϕ places the cation between two H atoms. Equilibrium bond distances also increase with off-axis angle. Energies where the cation is coplanar with the carbon ring are saddle points on the potential energy surface, which is consistent with the idea that interaction between a cation and the positive region of the quadrupole is not ideal.

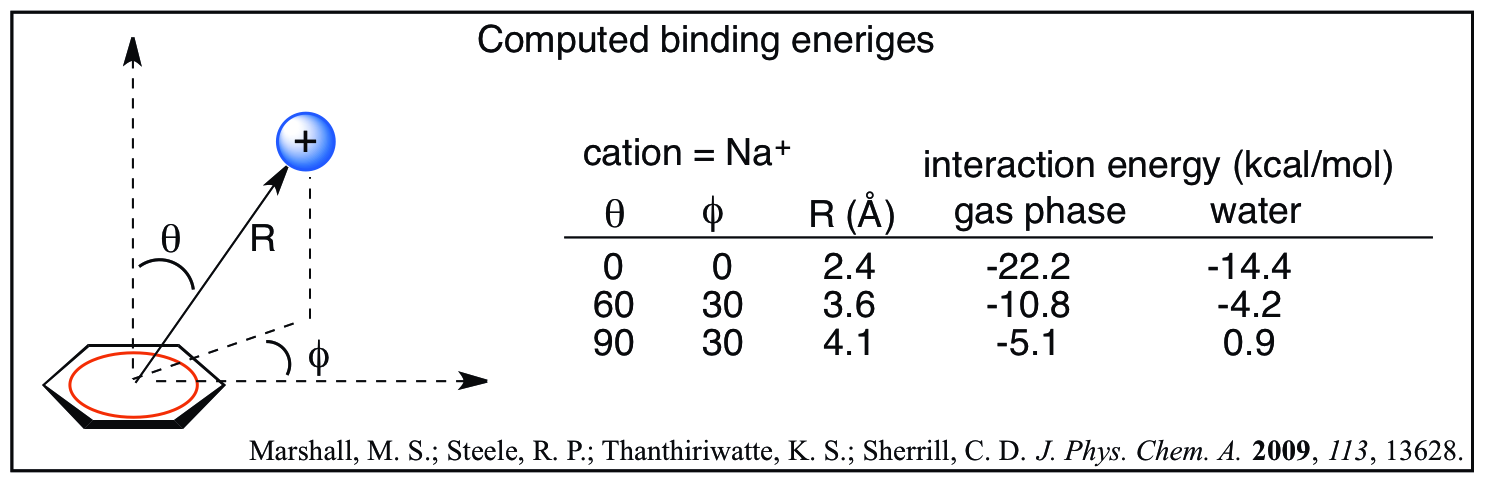

== Relative interaction strength ==
Theoretical calculations suggest the cation–π interaction is comparable to (and potentially stronger than) ammonium-carboxylate salt bridges in aqueous media. Computed values below show that as solvent polarity increases, the strength of the cation–π complex decreases less dramatically. This trend can be rationalized by desolvation effects: salt bridge formation has a high desolvation penalty for both charged species whereas the cation–π complex would only pay a significant penalty for the cation.

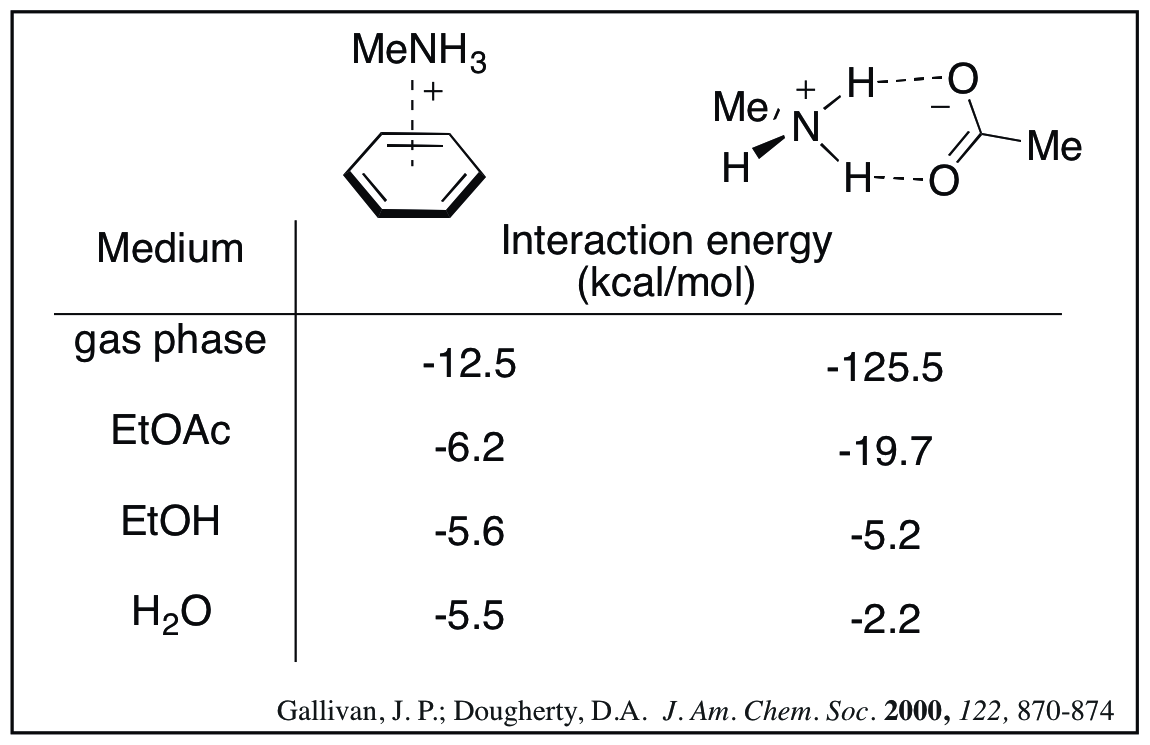

== In nature ==
Nature's building blocks contain aromatic moieties in high abundance. Recently, it has become clear that many structural features that were once thought to be purely hydrophobic in nature are in fact engaging in cation–π interactions. The amino acid side chains of phenylalanine, tryptophan, tyrosine, histidine, are capable of binding to cationic species such as charged amino acid side chains, metal ions, small-molecule neurotransmitters and pharmaceutical agents. In fact, macromolecular binding sites that were hypothesized to include anionic groups (based on affinity for cations) have been found to consist of aromatic residues instead in multiple cases. Cation–π interactions can tune the pKa of nitrogenous side-chains, increasing the abundance of the protonated form; this has implications for protein structure and function. While less studied in this context, the DNA bases are also able to participate in cation–π interactions.

=== Role in protein structure ===
Early evidence that cation–π interactions played a role in protein structure was the observation that in crystallographic data, aromatic side chains appear in close contact with nitrogen-containing side chains (which can exist as protonated, cationic species) with disproportionate frequency.

A study published in 1986 by Burley and Petsko looked at a diverse set of proteins and found that ~ 50% of aromatic residues Phe, Tyr, and Trp were within 6Å of amino groups. Furthermore, approximately 25% of nitrogen containing side chains Lys, Asn, Gln, and His were within van der Waals contact with aromatics and 50% of Arg in contact with multiple aromatic residues (2 on average).

Studies on larger data sets found similar trends, including some dramatic arrays of alternating stacks of cationic and aromatic side chains. In some cases the N-H hydrogens were aligned toward aromatic residues, and in others the cationic moiety was stacked above the π system. A particularly strong trend was found for close contacts between Arg and Trp. The guanidinium moiety of Arg in particular has a high propensity to be stacked on top of aromatic residues while also hydrogen-bonding with nearby oxygen atoms..

A recent study employing quantum chemistry shows the strong influence of dielectric screening in proteins as well as geometric considerations that influence the effective interaction between lysine residues and a phenylalanine ring. These data were supported by a statistical analysis of a large PDB-derived structure dataset of high resolution protein structures. The statistical data were normalized to allow for correct conclusions on spatial enrichment of chemical groups that cannot be explained on basis of proximity and reveal a low occurrence of geometries consistent with optimal cation–π interactions in the PDB. It is concluded that Lys–π interactions in proteins are context-dependent and likely contribute less to protein structure than previously assumed.

=== Molecular recognition and signaling ===
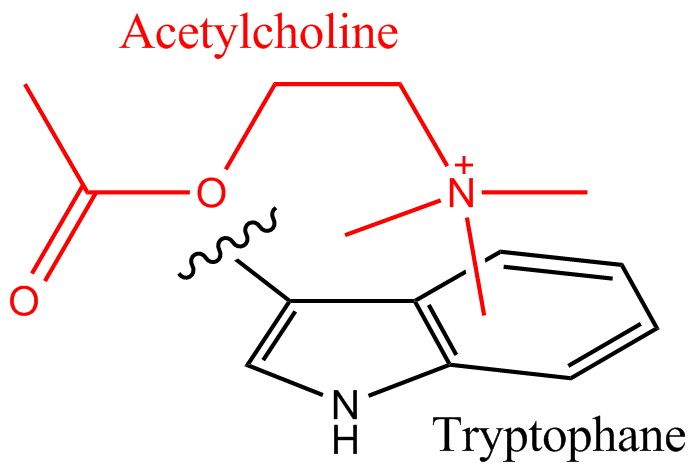
Cationic Acetylcholine binding to a tryptophan residue of the nicotinic acetylcholine receptor via a cation–π effect.

An example of cation–π interactions in molecular recognition is seen in the nicotinic acetylcholine receptor (nAChR) which binds its endogenous ligand, acetylcholine (a positively charged molecule), via a cation–π interaction to the quaternary ammonium. The nAChR neuroreceptor is a well-studied ligand-gated ion channel that opens upon acetylcholine binding. Acetylcholine receptors are therapeutic targets for a large host of neurological disorders, including Parkinson's disease, Alzheimer's disease, schizophrenia, depression and autism. Studies by Dougherty and coworkers confirmed that cation–π interactions are important for binding and activating nAChR by making specific structural variations to a key tryptophan residue and correlating activity results with cation–π binding ability.

The nAChR is especially important in binding nicotine in the brain, and plays a key role in nicotine addiction. Nicotine has a similar pharmacophore to acetylcholine, especially when protonated. Strong evidence supports cation–π interactions being central to the ability of nicotine to selectively activate brain receptors without affecting muscle activity.

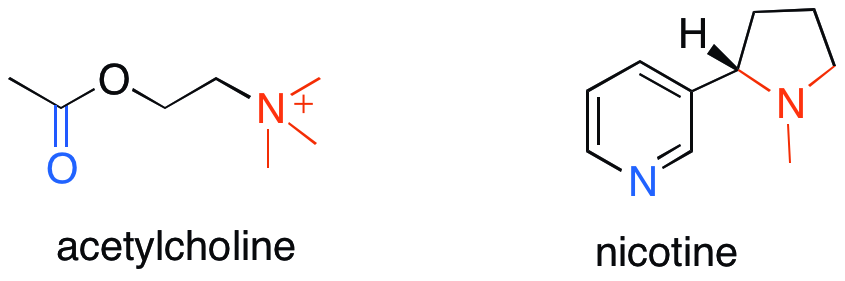

A further example is seen in the plant UV-B sensing protein UVR8. Several tryptophan residues interact via cation–π interactions with arginine residues which in turn form salt bridges with acidic residues on a second copy of the protein. It has been proposed that absorption of a photon by the tryptophan residues disrupts this interaction and leads to dissociation of the protein dimer.

Cation–π binding is also thought to be important in cell-surface recognition

=== Enzyme catalysis ===
Cation–π interactions can catalyze chemical reactions by stabilizing buildup of positive charge in transition states. This kind of effect is observed in enzymatic systems. For example, acetylcholine esterase contains important aromatic groups that bind quaternary ammonium in its active site.

Polycyclization enzymes also rely on cation–π interactions. Since proton-triggered polycyclizations of squalene proceed through a (potentially concerted) cationic cascade, cation–π interactions are ideal for stabilizing this dispersed positive charge. The crystal structure of squalene-hopene cyclase shows that the active site is lined with aromatic residues.

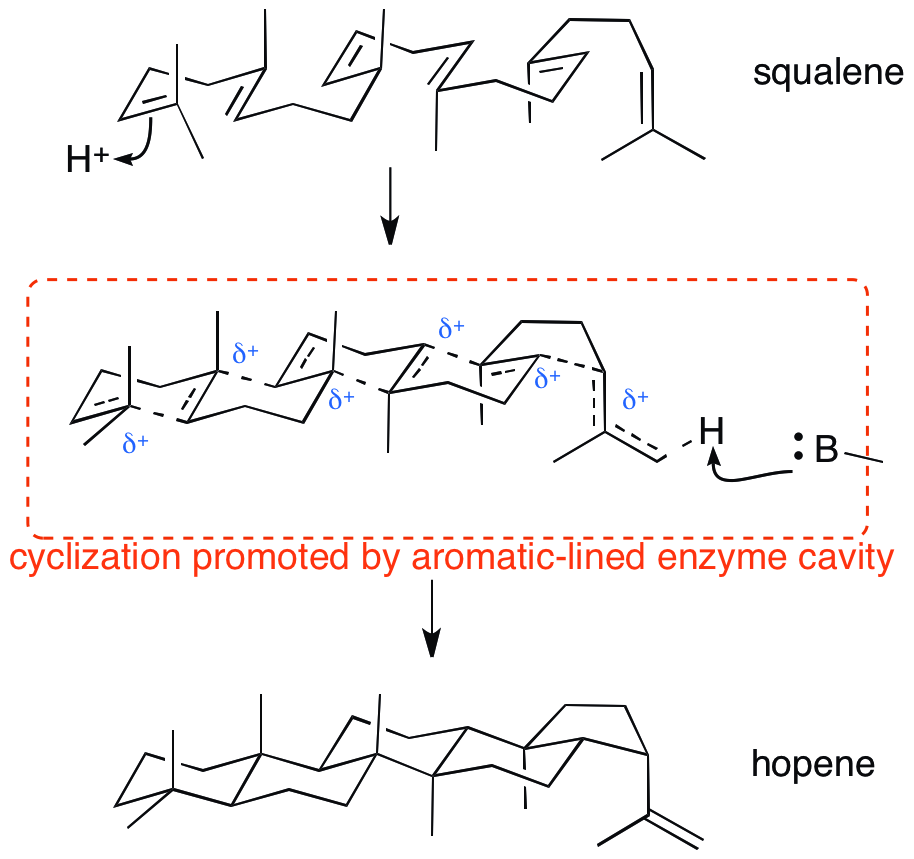
Cyclization of squalene to form hopene

== In synthetic systems ==
=== Solid state structures ===
Cation–π interactions have been observed in the crystals of synthetic molecules as well. For example, Aoki and coworkers compared the solid state structures of Indole-3-acetic acid choline ester and an uncharged analogue. In the charged species, an intramolecular cation–π interaction with the indole is observed, as well as an interaction with the indole moiety of the neighboring molecule in the lattice. In the crystal of the isosteric neutral compound the same folding is not observed and there are no interactions between the tert-butyl group and neighboring indoles.

Cation–π interaction in indole-3-acetic acid choline ester compared to neutral analog

=== Supramolecular receptors ===
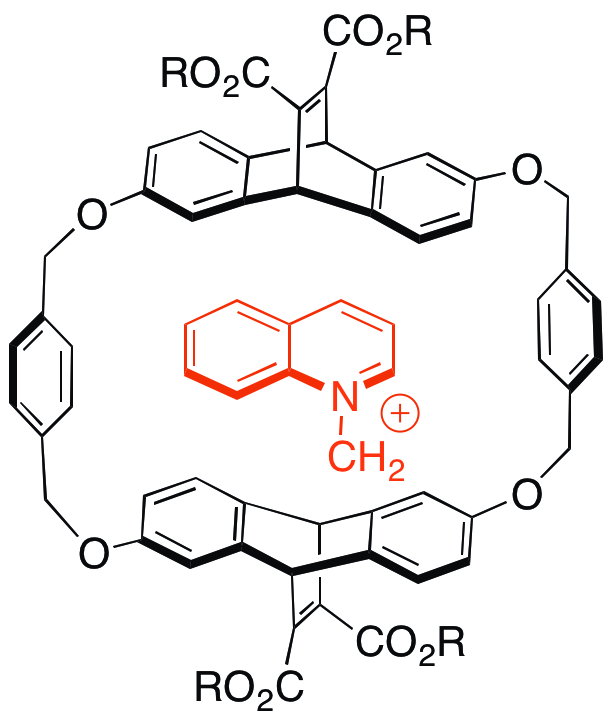
Cyclophane host–guest complex

Some of the first studies on the cation–π interaction involved looking at the interactions of charged, nitrogenous molecules in cyclophane host–guest chemistry. It was found that even when anionic solubilizing groups were appended to aromatic host capsules, cationic guests preferred to associate with the π-system in many cases. The type of host shown to the right was also able to catalyze N-alkylation reactions to form cationic products.

More recently, cation–π centered substrate binding and catalysis has been implicated in supramolecular metal-ligand cluster catalyst systems developed by Raymond and Bergman.

=== Use of π-π, CH-π, and π-cation interactions in supramolecular assembly ===
π-systems are important building blocks in supramolecular assembly because of their versatile noncovalent interactions with various functional groups. Particularly, π-π, CH-π, and π-cation interactions are widely used in supramolecular assembly and recognition.

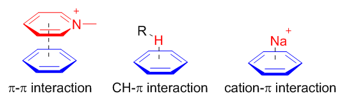
Fig. 1: Examples of π-π. CH-π, and π-cation interactions

π-π interaction concerns the direct interactions between two &pi-systems; and cation–π interaction arises from the electrostatic interaction of a cation with the face of the π-system. Unlike these two interactions, the CH-π interaction arises mainly from charge transfer between the C-H orbital and the π-system.

A notable example of applying π-π interactions in supramolecular assembly is the synthesis of catenane. The major challenge for the synthesis of catenane is to interlock molecules in a controlled fashion. Stoddart and co-workers developed a series of systems utilizing the strong π-π interactions between electron-rich benzene derivatives and electron-poor pyridinium rings. [2]Catanene was synthesized by reacting bis(pyridinium) (A), bisparaphenylene-34-crown-10 (B), and 1, 4-bis(bromomethyl)benzene C (Fig. 2). The π-π interaction between A and B directed the formation of an interlocked template intermediate that was further cyclized by substitution reaction with compound C to generate the [2]catenane product.

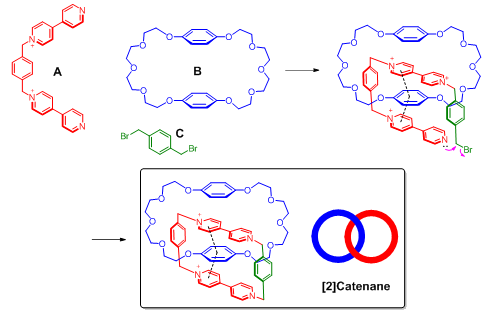
Fig. 2: The Stoddart synthesis of [2]catenane

=== Organic synthesis and catalysis ===
Cation–π interactions have likely been important, though unnoticed, in a multitude of organic reactions historically. Recently, however, attention has been drawn to potential applications in catalyst design. In particular, noncovalent organocatalysts have been found to sometimes exhibit reactivity and selectivity trends that correlate with cation–π binding properties. A polycyclization developed by Jacobsen and coworkers shows a particularly strong cation–π effect using the catalyst shown below.

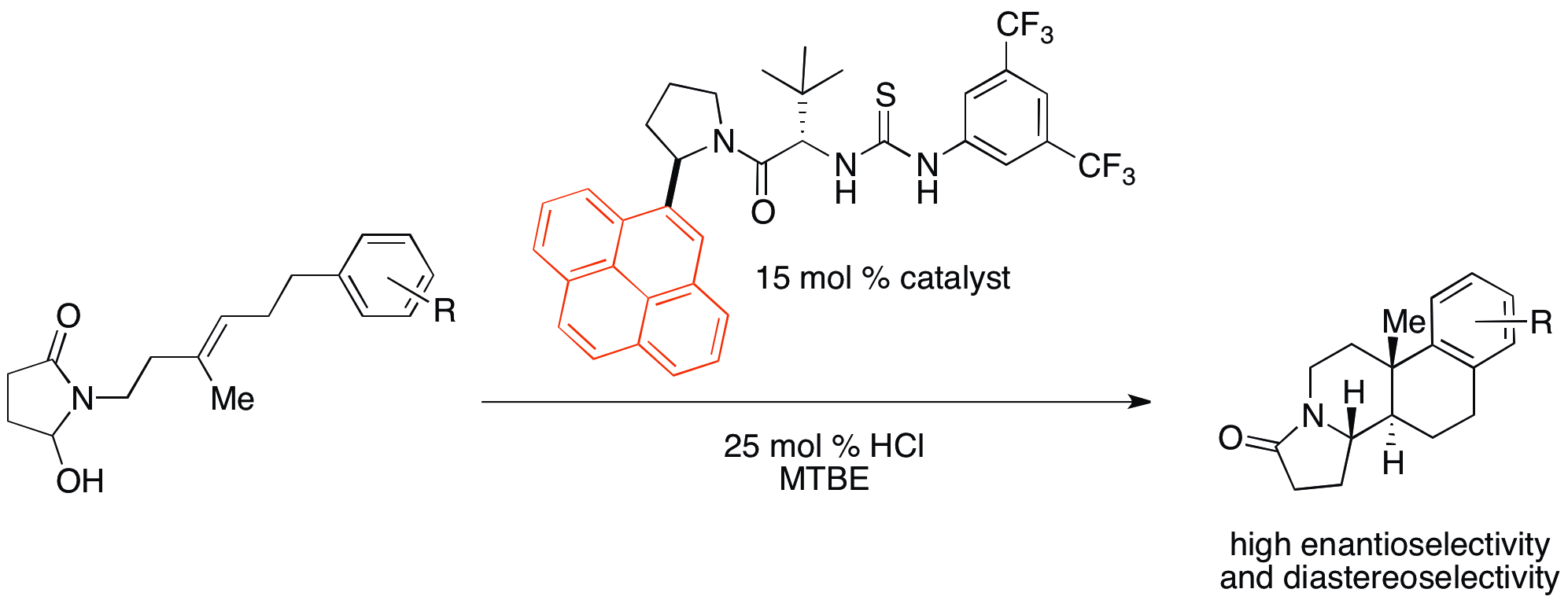

== Anion–π interaction ==
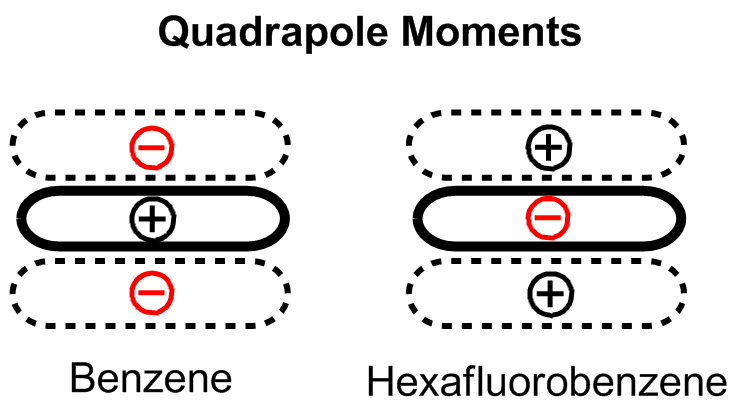
Quadrupole moments of benzene and hexafluorobenzene. The polarity is inverted due to differences in electronegativity for hydrogen and fluorine relative to carbon; the inverted quadrupole moment of hexafluorobenzene is necessary for anion-pi interactions.

In many respects, anion–π interaction is the opposite of cation–π interaction, although the underlying principles are identical. Significantly fewer examples are known to date. In order to attract a negative charge, the charge distribution of the π system has to be reversed. This is achieved by placing several strong electron withdrawing substituents along the π system (e. g. hexafluorobenzene). The anion–π effect is advantageously exploited in chemical sensors for specific anions.

== See also ==
- Stacking (chemistry)
- Salt bridge (protein)

== Sources ==
- J. C. Ma; D. A. Dougherty (1997). "The Cation–π Interaction". Chem. Rev. 97 (5): 1303–1324. doi:10.1021/cr9603744. PMID 11851453..
- Dougherty, D. A.; Stauffer, D. A. (Dec 1990). "Acetylcholine binding by a synthetic receptor: implications for biological recognition". Science. 250 (4987): 1558–1560. Bibcode:1990Sci...250.1558D. doi:10.1126/science.2274786. ISSN 0036-8075. PMID 2274786. S2CID 20210121.
