= Makoto Fujita (chemist) =

Japanese chemist

- 藤田 誠
- Born: 1957 (age 68–69); Tokyo, Japan
- Education: Chiba University (BS, MS); Tokyo Institute of Technology (PhD)
- Known for: Metal–organic framework
- Awards: Arthur C. Cope Scholar Award (2013); Medal with Purple Ribbon (2014); Wolf Prize in Chemistry (2018); Clarivate Citation Laureate (2020); Asahi Prize (2023)
- Scientific career
- Fields: Chemistry
- Workplaces: Nagoya University; University of Tokyo

Makoto Fujita (藤田 誠, Fujita Makoto) is a Japanese chemist who specializes in supramolecular coordination chemistry. He is the Distinguished Professor at the University of Tokyo and a Foreign Honorary Member of the American Academy of Arts and Sciences (AAAS).

== Career ==
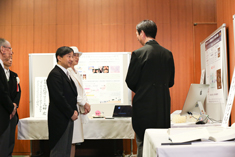
with Emperor Naruhito and Empress Masako (at the Building of Japan Academy on 17 June 2019)

He is a professor in the Department of Applied Chemistry at the University of Tokyo. He has published extensively on the multicomponent assembly of large coordination cages. Compounds designed and prepared in his research group are variously described as three-dimensional synthetic receptors, coordination assemblies, molecular paneling, molecular flasks, crystalline sponges, and coordination capsules.

He shared the 2018 Wolf Prize in Chemistry with Omar Yaghi "for conceiving metal-directed assembly principles leading to large highly porous complexes".

Hideki Shirakawa predicted in 2014 that Fujita would win the Nobel Prize in Chemistry.

== Recognition ==
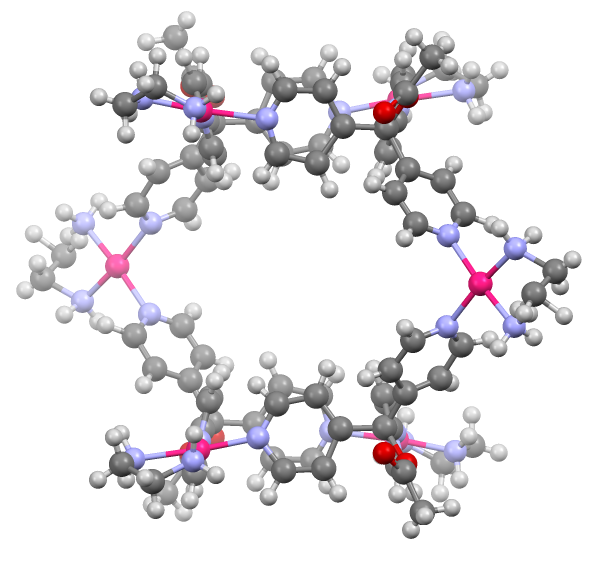
Structure of Fujita's {[Pd(en)]_{6}L_{4}}^{12+} (en = ethylenediamine, L = tripyridine ligand CH_{3}CO_{2}C(C_{5}H_{4}N)_{3}).

- 1994 – Progress Award in Synthetic Organic Chemistry, Japan
- 2000 – Division Award of Chemical Society of Japan (Organic Chemistry)
- 2001 – Japan IBM Science Prize
- 2009 – The Commendation for Science and Technology by the MEXT Prizes for Science and Technology
- 2010 – The 7th Leo Esaki Prize
- 2010 – Thomson Reuters Research Front Award
- 2011 – 3M Lectureship Award (The University of British Columbia)
- 2012 – Kharasch Lecturers (The University of Chicago)
- 2013 – Arthur C. Cope Scholar Award
- 2013 – The Chemical Society of Japan (CSJ) Award
- 2013 – Merck-Karl Pfister Visiting Professorship (MIT Lectureship award)
- 2014 – Medal with Purple Ribbon
- 2014 – Fred Basolo Medal (Northwestern University)
- 2018 – Wolf Prize in Chemistry
- 2019 – Paul Karrer Gold Medal
- 2019 and 2020 – Asian Scientist 100, Asian Scientist
- 2020 – Clarivate Citation Laureate
- 2020 – Chunichi Culture Award
- 2023 – Asahi Prize
- 2025 - Foreign Honorary Member of the American Academy of Arts and Sciences (AAAS).
