= Sponger =

Sponger can refer to:

- The Spongers , a 1978 television play by Jim Allen
- A practitioner of sponge diving
- The mascot of Tarpon Springs High School
- A term used in Trencadís, a mosaic technique

== See also ==
- Schnorrer, a Yiddish term for "sponger"
- Sponge (disambiguation)
