= Lists of sponges =

The following are lists of sponges:

- List of prehistoric sponge genera
- List of sponges of Ireland
- List of sponges of South Africa
- List of sponges of Venezuela

== See also ==
- Sponge (disambiguation)
- List of SpongeBob SquarePants characters
