= Pi-interaction =

Chemical bond effect

In chemistry, π-effects or π-interactions are a type of non-covalent interaction that involves π systems. Just like in an electrostatic interaction where a region of negative charge interacts with a positive charge, the electron-rich π system can interact with a metal (cationic or neutral), an anion, another molecule and even another π system. Non-covalent interactions involving π systems are pivotal to biological events such as protein-ligand recognition.

== Types ==
The most common types of π-interactions involve:

- Metal–π interactions: involves interaction of a metal and the face of a π system, the metal can be a cation (known as cation–π interactions) or neutral
- Polar–π interactions: involves interaction of a polar molecule and quadrupole moment a π system.

Polar π interaction between water molecule and benzene

- Aromatic–aromatic interactions (π stacking): involves interactions of aromatic molecules with each other.
  - Arene–perfluoroarene interaction: electron-rich benzene ring interacts with electron-poor hexafluorobenzene.

Arene perfluoroarene stacking

- π donor–acceptor interactions: interaction between low energy empty orbital (acceptor) and a high-energy filled orbital (donor).

Donor-acceptor interaction between hexamethylbenzene (donor) and tetracyanoethylene (acceptor)

- Anion–π interactions: interaction of anion with π system
- Cation–π interactions: interaction of a cation with a π system
- C–H–π interactions: interaction of C-H with π system: These interactions are well studied using experimental as well as computational techniques.

== Examples ==
Pi-stacking Examples

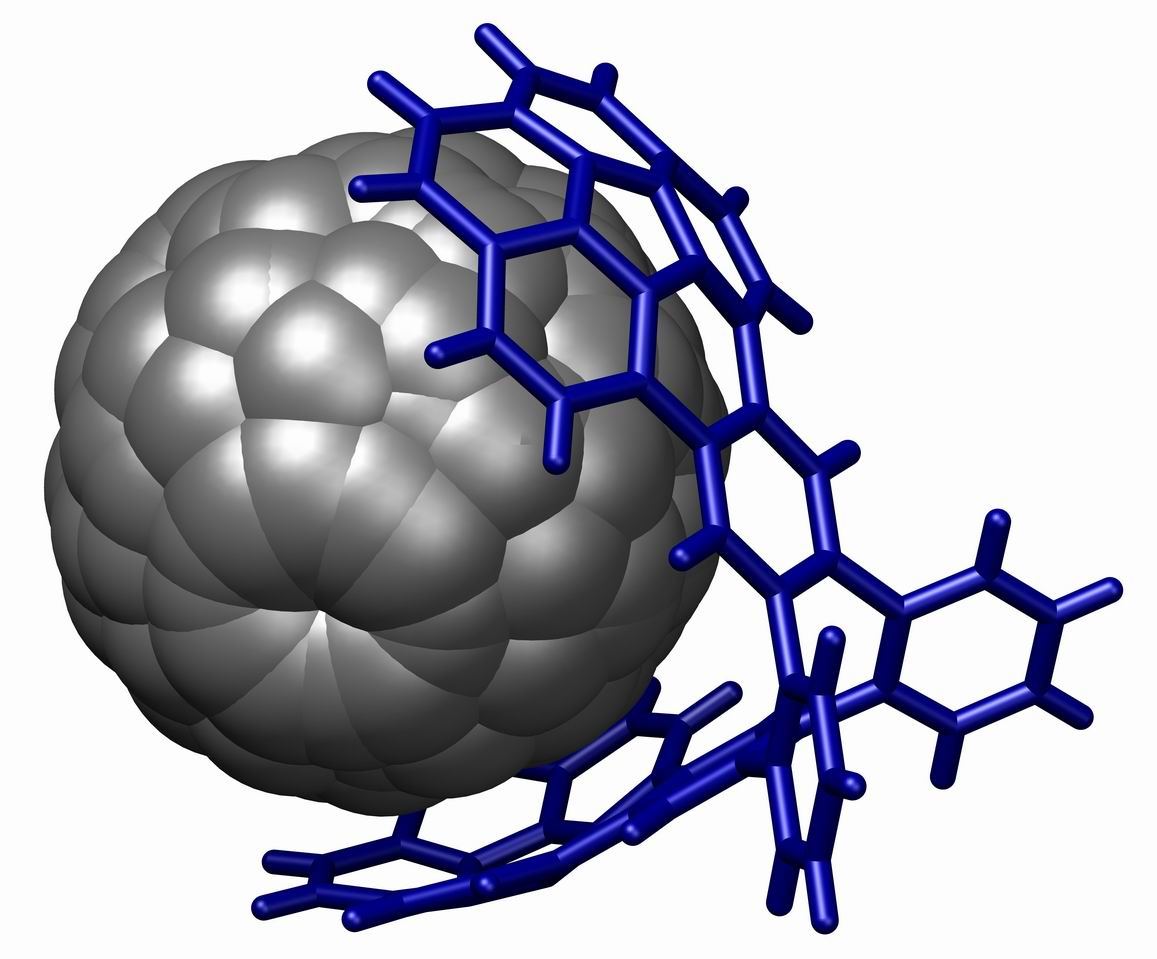
A fullerene bound in a buckycatcher through aromatic stacking interactions.

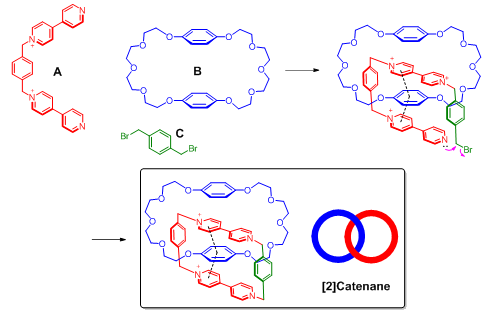
The Stoddart synthesis of [2] catenane...

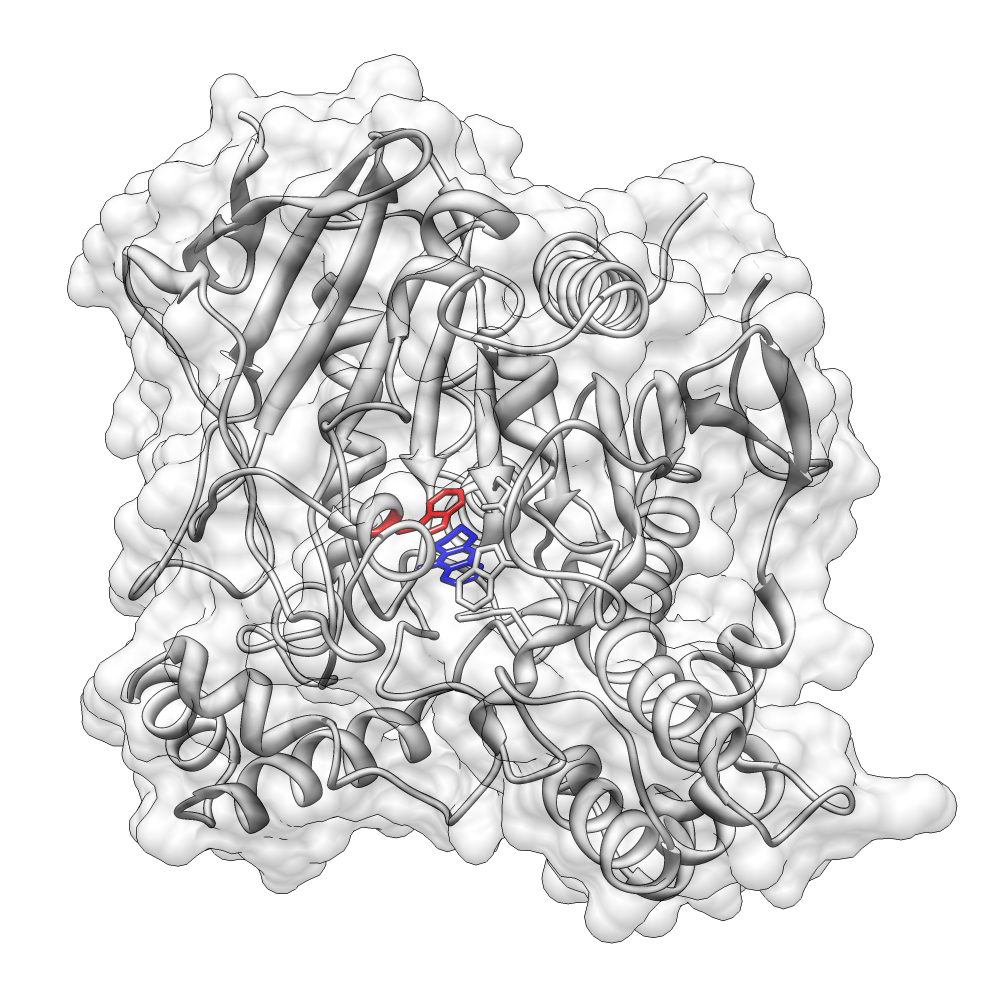
Tacrine bound to acetylcholinesterase (PDB 1ACJ). A pi stacking interaction between tacrine (blue) and Trp84 (red) is proposed

Polar π interaction between water molecule and benzene

Arene perfluoroarene stacking

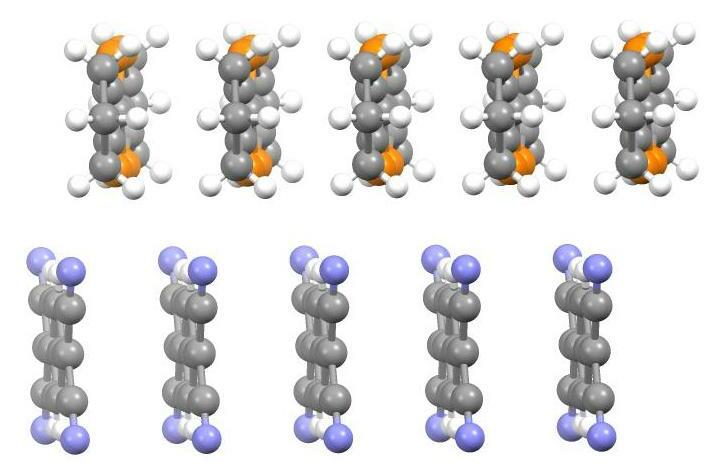
Edge-on view of portion of crystal structure of hexamethyleneTTF/TCNQ charge transfer salt, highlighting the segregated stacking.

== Graphite ==
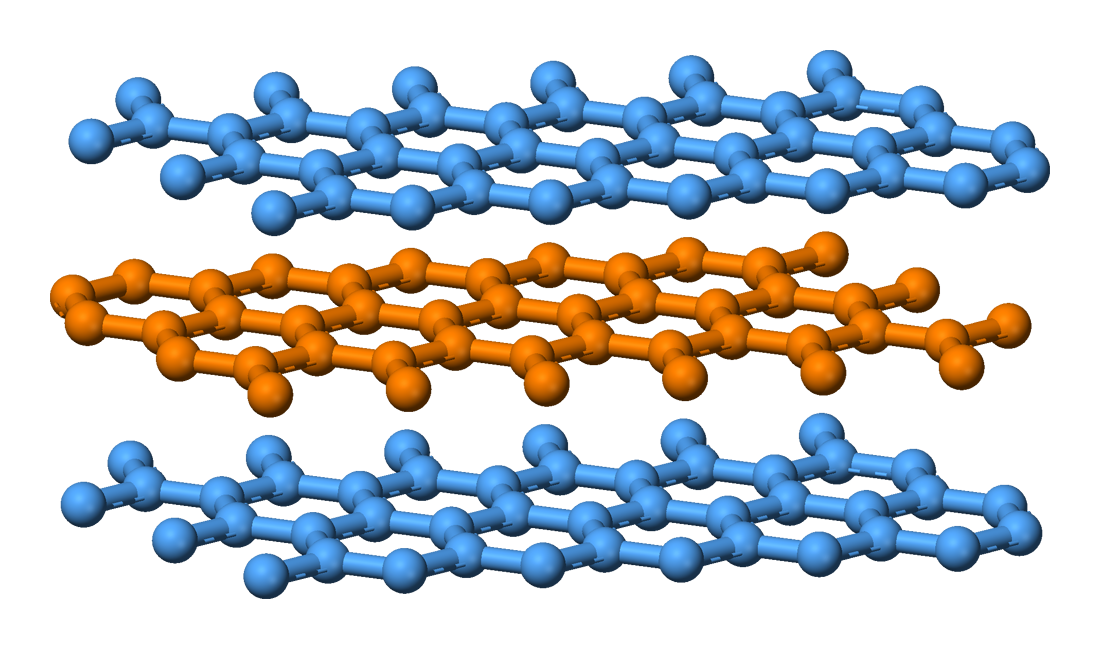
Side view of ABA layer stacking in graphite

Graphite consists of stacked sheets of covalently bonded carbon. The individual layers are called graphene. In each layer, each carbon atom is bonded to three other atoms forming a continuous layer of sp^{2} bonded carbon hexagons, like a honeycomb lattice with a bond length of 0.142 nm, and the distance between planes is 0.335 nm.

=== π-effects in biological systems ===
Cation-π interactions are important for the acetylcholine (Ach) neurotransmitter. The structure of acetylcholine esterase includes 14 highly conserved aromatic residues. The trimethyl ammonium group of Ach binds to the aromatic residue of tryptophan (Trp). The indole site provides a much more intense region of negative electrostatic potential than benzene and phenol residue of Phe and Tyr.

Pi–pi and cation–pi interactions are important in rational drug design. One example is the FDA-approved acetylcholinesterase (AChE) inhibitor tacrine which is used in the treatment of Alzheimer's disease. Tacrine is proposed to have a pi stacking interaction with the indolic ring of Trp84, and this interaction has been exploited in the rational design of novel AChE inhibitors.

=== Supramolecular assembly ===
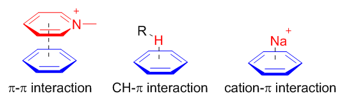
Examples of $\ce{\pi-\pi}$, $\ce{CH-\pi}$, and $\ce{\pi -cation}$ interactions

$\ce{\pi - \pi}$, $\ce{CH-\pi}$ and $\ce{\pi -cation}$ interactions are widely observed motifs in supramolecular assembly and recognition.

$\ce{\pi-\pi}$ concerns the direct interactions between two π-systems; and $\ce{cation-\pi}$ interaction arises from the electrostatic interaction of a cation with the face of the π-system. Unlike these two interactions, the $\ce{CH-\pi}$ interaction arises mainly from charge transfer between the C–H orbital and the π-system.

π systems contribute to supramolecular assembly. Some catenanes feature π–π interactions. The major challenge for the synthesis of catenane is to interlock molecules in a controlled fashion. Stoddart and co-workers developed a series of systems utilizing the strong π–π interactions between electron-rich benzene derivatives and electron-poor pyridinium rings. [2]Catanene was synthesized by reacting bis(pyridinium) (A), bisparaphenylene-34-crown-10 (B), and 1, 4-bis(bromomethyl)benzene (C) (Fig. 2). The π–π interaction between A and B directed the formation of an interlocked template intermediate that was further cyclized by substitution reaction with compound C to generate the [2]catenane product.

=== Charge transfer salts ===
A combination of tetracyanoquinodimethane (TCNQ) and tetrathiafulvalene (TTF) forms a strong charge-transfer complex referred to as TTF-TCNQ. The solid shows almost metallic electrical conductance. In a TTF-TCNQ crystal, TTF and TCNQ molecules are arranged independently in separate parallel-aligned stacks, and an electron transfer occurs from donor (TTF) to acceptor (TCNQ) stacks.

== Anion–π interactions ==
Anion and π–aromatic systems (typically electron-deficient) create an interaction that is associated with the repulsive forces of the structures. These repulsive forces involve electrostatic and anion-induced polarized interactions. This force allows for the systems to be used as receptors and channels in supramolecular chemistry for applications in the medical (synthetic membranes, ion channels) and environmental fields (e.g. sensing, removal of ions from water).

The first X-ray crystal structure that depicted anion–π interactions was reported in 2004. In addition to this being depicted in the solid state, there is also evidence that the interaction is present in solution.

== π-effects in biological systems ==
π-effects have an important contribution to biological systems since they provide a significant amount of binding enthalpy. Neurotransmitters produce most of their biological effect by binding to the active site of a protein receptor. Cation-π interactions are important for the acetylcholine (Ach) neurotransmitter. The structure of cholinesterase includes 14 highly conserved aromatic residues. The trimethyl ammonium group of Ach binds to the aromatic residue of tryptophan (Trp). The indole site provides a much more intense region of negative electrostatic potential than benzene and phenol residue of Phe and Tyr.

== In supramolecular assembly ==
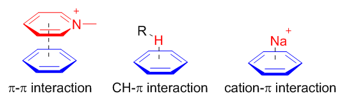
Examples of $\ce{\pi-\pi}$, $\ce{CH-\pi}$, and $\ce{\pi -cation}$ interactions

π systems are important building blocks in supramolecular assembly because of their versatile noncovalent interactions with various functional groups. Particularly, $\ce{\pi - \pi}$ , $\ce{CH-\pi}$ and $\ce{\pi -cation}$ interactions are widely used in supramolecular assembly and recognition.

$\ce{\pi-\pi}$ concerns the direct interactions between two π-systems; and $\ce{cation-\pi}$ interaction arises from the electrostatic interaction of a cation with the face of the π-system. Unlike these two interactions, the $\ce{CH-\pi}$ interaction arises mainly from charge transfer between the C–H orbital and the π-system.

== See also ==
- Noncovalent interaction
- Dispersion (chemistry)
- Cation–pi interaction
- Intercalation (biochemistry)
- Intercalation (chemistry)
