= SPONGE =

Political pressure group

SPONGE, an acronym for Society for the Prevention of Niggers (or more often cited, "Negroes") Getting Everything, was an organization founded in New York City prior to April 11, 1964 (when it was mentioned in a performance of "America, Be Seated!" at the 1964 World's Fair). While the group at its peak never numbered more than about one hundred members, SPONGE received media coverage, due to the group's attention-getting name and provocative actions. Its founder and first President was reported to be named James "Sandy" McMenemon.

The group consisted mostly of young Italian American males that hailed from predominantly ethnic neighborhoods of East New York, Bensonhurst, and Bay Ridge in Brooklyn. When queried about the irony of a group of Italian males being led by an Irish-American, one SPONGE member simply explained "[b]ecause Irish, Polish, and Jewish guys are on our [the Italian] side, that's why."

SPONGE's most publicized moment came in 1965, when its members confronted a group of demonstrators made up of members of the Congress of Racial Equality (CORE) and disrupted their picket line.

SPONGE received further local media coverage in 1978, when a number of students from Brighton High School in Boston, Massachusetts, listed themselves as members of SPONGE in their senior yearbooks. When the meaning of the acronym was uncovered, the students were disciplined, and the whole run of the yearbooks recalled and reprinted without the reference. It was also alleged in 1998 that the Riverside Police Department in California had a clandestine group by this name.

== Bibliography ==
- Cannato, Vincent. The Ungovernable City: John Lindsay and his Struggle to Save New York, Basic Books, 2002
- English, T. J. The Savage City: Race, Murder, and a Generation on the Edge, William Morrow Pub., 2011
- The New York Times circa 1965-1968
