= Reduction potential =

Measure of the tendency of a substance to gain or lose electrons

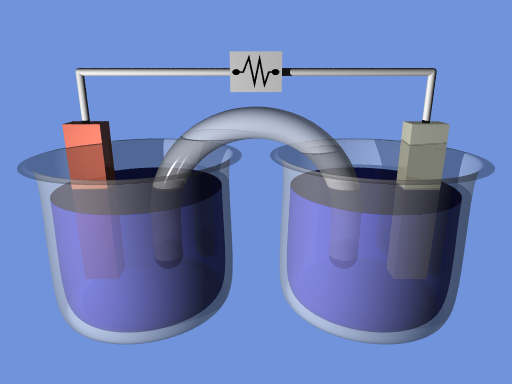
Artistic view of an electrochemical cell.

Redox potential (also known as oxidation / reduction potential, ORP, pe, $E_{red}$, or $E_{h}$) is a measure of the tendency of a chemical species to acquire electrons from, or lose electrons to, an electrode and thereby be reduced or oxidised respectively. Redox potential is expressed in volts (V). Each species has its own intrinsic redox potential; for example, the more positive the reduction potential (reduction potential is more commonly used due to the general formalism in electrochemistry), the greater the species' affinity for electrons and its tendency to be reduced (stronger oxidising agent).

== Measurement and interpretation ==
In aqueous solutions, redox potential is a measure of the tendency of the solution to either gain or lose electrons in a reaction. A solution where the solute has a higher (more positive) reduction potential than some other molecule will have a tendency to gain electrons from this molecule (i.e. to be reduced by oxidizing this other molecule), and a solution with a lower (more negative) reduction potential will have a tendency to lose electrons to other substances (i.e. to be oxidized by reducing the other substance). Because the absolute potentials are almost impossible to accurately measure, reduction potentials are defined relative to a reference electrode. Reduction potentials of aqueous solutions are determined by measuring the potential difference between an inert sensing electrode in contact with the solution and a stable reference electrode connected to the solution by a salt bridge.

The sensing electrode acts as a platform for electron transfer to or from the reference half cell; it is typically made of platinum, although gold and graphite can be used as well. The reference half cell consists of a redox standard of known potential. The standard hydrogen electrode (SHE) is the reference from which all standard redox potentials are determined, and has been assigned an arbitrary half cell potential of 0.0 V. However, it is fragile and impractical for routine laboratory use. Therefore, more stable reference electrodes, such as silver chloride and saturated calomel (SCE), are commonly used because of their more reliable performance.

Although measurement of the redox potential in aqueous solutions is relatively straightforward, many factors limit its interpretation, such as effects of solution temperature and pH, irreversible reactions, slow electrode kinetics, non-equilibrium, presence of multiple redox couples, electrode poisoning, small exchange currents, and inert redox couples. Consequently, practical measurements seldom correlate with calculated values. Nevertheless, reduction potential measurement has proven useful as an analytical tool in monitoring changes in a system rather than determining their absolute value (e.g. process control and titrations).

== Explanation ==
Similar to how the concentration of hydrogen ions determines the acidity or pH of an aqueous solution, the tendency of electron transfer between a chemical species and an electrode determines the redox potential of an electrode couple. Like pH, redox potential represents how easily electrons are transferred to or from species in solution. Redox potential characterises the ability under the specific condition of a chemical species to lose or gain electrons instead of the amount of electrons available for oxidation or reduction.

The notion of pe is used with Pourbaix diagrams. pe is a dimensionless number and can easily be related to E_{H} by the following relationship:

$$pe = \frac{E_{H}}{V_T \lambda} = \frac{E_{H}}{0.05916} = 16.903 \, \text{×} \, E_{H}$$

where, $V_T=\frac{RT}{F}$ is the thermal voltage, with R, the gas constant (8.314 J⋅K^{−1}⋅mol^{−1}), T, the absolute temperature in Kelvin (298.15 K = 25 °C = 77 °F), F, the Faraday constant (96 485 coulomb/mol of e^{−}), and λ = ln(10) ≈ 2.3026.

In fact, $pe = -\log[e^-]$ is defined as the negative logarithm of the free electron concentration in solution, and is directly proportional to the redox potential. Sometimes $pe$ is used as a unit of reduction potential instead of $E_h$, for example, in environmental chemistry. If one normalizes $pe$ of hydrogen to zero, one obtains the relation $pe = 16.9\ E_h$ at room temperature. This notion is useful for understanding redox potential, although the transfer of electrons, rather than the absolute concentration of free electrons in thermal equilibrium, is how one usually thinks of redox potential. Theoretically, however, the two approaches are equivalent.

Conversely, one could define a potential corresponding to pH as a potential difference between a solute and pH neutral water, separated by porous membrane (that is permeable to hydrogen ions). Such potential differences actually do occur from differences in acidity on biological membranes. This potential (where pH neutral water is set to 0 V) is analogous with redox potential (where standardized hydrogen solution is set to 0 V), but instead of hydrogen ions, electrons are transferred across in the redox case. Both pH and redox potentials are properties of solutions, not of elements or chemical compounds themselves, and depend on factors like concentration and temperature.

The table below shows a few reduction potentials, which can be changed to oxidation potentials by reversing the sign. Reducers donate electrons to (or "reduce") oxidizing agents, which are said to "be reduced by" the reducer. The reducer is stronger when it has a more negative reduction potential and weaker when it has a more positive reduction potential. The more positive the reduction potential, the greater the species' electron affinity and tendency to be reduced. The following table provides the reduction potentials of the indicated reducing agent at 25 °C. For example, among sodium (Na) metal, chromium (Cr) metal, cuprous (Cu^{+}) ion and chloride (Cl^{−}) ion, it is Na metal that is the strongest reducing agent while Cl^{−} ion is the weakest; said differently, Na^{+} ion is the weakest oxidizing agent in this list, while Cl_{2} molecule is the strongest.

Reduction potentials of various reactions v
| Oxidizing agent | | Reducing agent | Reduction Potential (V) |
|---|---|---|---|
| Li^{+} + e^{−} | ⇌ | Li | −3.04 |
| Na^{+} + e^{−} | ⇌ | Na | −2.71 |
| Mg^{2+} + 2 e^{−} | ⇌ | Mg | −2.38 |
| Al^{3+} + 3 e^{−} | ⇌ | Al | −1.66 |
| 2 H_{2}O (l) + 2 e^{−} | ⇌ | H_{2} (g) + 2 OH^{−} | −0.83 |
| Cr^{3+} + 3 e^{−} | ⇌ | Cr | −0.74 |
| Fe^{2+} + 2 e^{−} | ⇌ | Fe | −0.44 |
| 2 H^{+} + 2 e^{−} | ⇌ | H_{2} | 0.00 |
| Sn^{4+} + 2 e^{−} | ⇌ | Sn^{2+} | +0.15 |
| Cu^{2+} + e^{−} | ⇌ | Cu^{+} | +0.16 |
| Ag^{+} + e^{−} | ⇌ | Ag | +0.80 |
| Br_{2} + 2 e^{−} | ⇌ | 2 Br^{−} | +1.07 |
| Cl_{2} + 2 e^{−} | ⇌ | 2 Cl^{−} | +1.36 |
| MnO^{−}_{4} + 8 H^{+} + 5 e^{−} | ⇌ | Mn^{2+} + 4 H_{2}O | +1.49 |
| F_{2} + 2 e^{−} | ⇌ | 2 F^{−} | +2.87 |

Some elements and compounds can be reducing or oxidizing agents, depending on the specific reaction. For example, hydrogen gas is a reducing agent when it reacts with non-metals and an oxidizing agent when it reacts with metals.

In the formation of lithium hydride, hydrogen (whose reduction potential is 0.0) acts as an oxidizing agent because it accepts an electron donation from the reducing agent lithium (whose reduction potential is −3.04), which causes lithium to be oxidized and hydrogen to be reduced.

2 Li (s) + H_{2} (g) → 2 LiH (s) (Note: Half reactions: 2 Li (s) → 2 Li^{+} (s) + 2 e^{−} combined along with: H_{2} (g) → 2 H^{+} (g) + 2 e^{−})

In the formation of hydrofluoric acid, hydrogen acts as a reducing agent because it donates its electrons to fluorine, which allows fluorine to be reduced.

H_{2} (g) + F_{2} (g) → 2 HF (g) (Note: Half reactions: H_{2} (g) → 2 H^{+} (g) + 2 e^{−} combined along with: F_{2} (g) + 2 e^{−} → 2 F^{−} (g))

== Standard reduction potential ==
The standard reduction potential $E^{\ominus}_{\text{red}}$ is measured under standard conditions: T = 298.15 K (25 °C, or 77 °F), a unity activity (a = 1) for each ion participating into the reaction, a partial pressure of 1 atm (1.013 bar) for each gas taking part into the reaction, and metals in their pure state. The standard reduction potential $E^{\ominus}_{\text{red}}$ is defined relative to the standard hydrogen electrode (SHE) used as reference electrode, which is arbitrarily given a potential of 0.00 V. However, because these can also be referred to as "redox potentials", the terms "reduction potentials" and "oxidation potentials" are preferred by the IUPAC. The two may be explicitly distinguished by the symbols $E_{\text{red}}$ and $E_{\text{ox}}$, with $E_{\text{ox}} = -E_{\text{red}}$.

== Half-cells ==
The relative reactivities of different half-cells can be compared to predict the direction of electron flow. A higher $E^{\ominus}_{red}$ value indicates a greater tendency for reduction, while a lower one indicates a greater tendency for oxidation.

Any system or environment that accepts electrons from a normal hydrogen electrode is a half-cell with a positive redox potential; any system donating electrons to the hydrogen electrode is a half-cell with a negative redox potential. $E_{h}$ is usually expressed in volts (V) or millivolts (mV). A high positive $E_{h}$ indicates an environment that favors oxidation reactions such as free oxygen. A low negative $E_{h}$ indicates a strong reducing environment, such as free metals.

Sometimes when electrolysis is carried out in an aqueous solution, water is oxidized or reduced instead of the solute. For example, if an aqueous solution of NaCl is electrolyzed, water may be reduced at the cathode to produce H_{2}(g) and OH^{−} ions, instead of Na^{+} being reduced to Na(s), as occurs in the absence of water. The reduction potential of each species present determines which species is oxidized or reduced.

Absolute reduction potentials can be determined if one knows the actual potential between electrode and electrolyte for any one reaction. Surface polarization interferes with measurements, but various sources give an estimated potential for the standard hydrogen electrode of 4.4 V to 4.6 V (with the electrolyte being positive).

Half-cell equations can be combined by reversing the oxidation half-cell equation so that each electron given by the reductant is accepted by the oxidant. In this way, the global combined equation no longer contains electrons.

== Nernst equation ==
The $E_h$ and pH of a solution are related by the Nernst equation as commonly represented by a Pourbaix diagram ($E_h$ – pH plot). For a half cell equation, conventionally written as a reduction reaction (i.e., electrons accepted by an oxidant on the left side):

$$a \, A + b \, B + h \, \ce{H+} + z \, e^{-} \quad \ce{<=>} \quad c \, C + d \, D$$

The half-cell standard reduction potential $E^{\ominus}_\text{red}$ is given by

$$E^{\ominus}_\text{red} (\text{volts}) = -\frac{\Delta G^\ominus}{zF}$$

where $\Delta G^\ominus$ is the standard Gibbs free energy change, z is the number of electrons involved, and F is Faraday's constant. The Nernst equation relates pH and $E_h$:

$$E_h = E_\text{red} = E^{\ominus}_\text{red} - \frac{0.05916}{z} \log\left(\frac{\{C\}^c\{D\}^d}{\{A\}^a\{B\}^b}\right) - \frac{0.05916\,h}{z} \text{pH}$$

where curly brackets indicate activities, and exponents are shown in the conventional manner.
This equation is the equation of a straight line for $E_h$ as a function of pH with a slope of $-0.05916\,\left(\frac{h}{z}\right)$ volt (pH has no units).

This equation predicts lower $E_h$ at higher pH values. This is observed for the reduction of O_{2} into H_{2}O, or OH^{−}, and for reduction of H^{+} into H_{2}:

O_{2} + 4 H^{+} + 4 e^{−} ⇌ 2 H_{2}O
O_{2} + 2 H_{2}O + 4 e^{−} ⇌ 4 OH^{−}
2 H^{+} + 2 e^{−} ⇌ H_{2}

In most (if not all) of the reduction reactions involving oxyanions with a central redox-active atom, oxide anions (O^{2−}) being in excess are freed-up when the central atom is reduced. The acid-base neutralization of each oxide ion consumes 2 H^{+} or one H_{2}O molecule:

O^{2−} + 2 H^{+} ⇌ H_{2}O
O^{2−} + H_{2}O ⇌ 2 OH^{−}

This is why protons are always engaged as reagent on the left side of the reduction reactions, as can be generally observed in the table of standard reduction potential (data page).

If, in very rare instances of reduction reactions, the H^{+} were the products formed by a reduction reaction and thus appearing on the right side of the equation, the slope of the line would be inverse and thus positive (higher $E_h$ at higher pH).

An example of that would be the reductive dissolution of magnetite (Fe_{3}O_{4} ≈ Fe_{2}O_{3}·FeO with 2 Fe^{3+} and 1 Fe^{2+}) to form 3 HFeO^{−}_{2}(aq) (in which dissolved iron, Fe(II), is divalent and much more soluble than Fe(III)), while releasing one H^{+}:

Fe_{3}O_{4} + 2 H_{2}O + 2 e^{−} ⇌ 3 HFeO^{−}_{2} + H^{+}

where:

E_{h} = −1.1819 − 0.0885 log [HFeO^{−}_{2}]^{3} + 0.0296 pH

The slope 0.0296 of the line is −1/2 of the −0.05916 value above, since h/z = −1/2. Additionally, the value −0.0885 corresponds to −0.05916 × 3/2.

== Biochemistry ==
Many enzymatic reactions are oxidation–reduction reactions, in which one compound is oxidized and another compound is reduced. The ability of an organism to carry out oxidation–reduction reactions depends on the oxidation–reduction state of the environment, or its reduction potential ($E_h$).

Strictly aerobic microorganisms are generally active at positive $E_h$ values, whereas strict anaerobes are generally active at negative $E_h$ values. Redox affects the solubility of nutrients, especially metal ions.

There are organisms that can adjust their metabolism to their environment, such as facultative anaerobes. Facultative anaerobes can be active at positive E_{h} values, and at negative E_{h} values in the presence of oxygen-bearing inorganic compounds, such as nitrates and sulfates.

In biochemistry, apparent standard reduction potentials, or formal potentials, ($E^{\ominus '}_{\text{red}}$, noted with a prime ' mark in superscript) calculated at pH 7, closer to the pH of biological and intra-cellular fluids, are used to more easily assess if a given biochemical redox reaction is possible. They must not be confused with the common standard reduction potentials ($E^{\ominus}_{\text{red}}$) determined under standard conditions (T = 298.15 K = 25 °C = 77 °F; P_{gas} = 1 atm = 1.013 bar) with the concentration of each dissolved species being taken as 1 M, and thus [ H^{+}] = 1 M and pH = 0.

== Environmental chemistry ==
In the field of environmental chemistry, the reduction potential is used to determine if oxidizing or reducing conditions are prevalent in water or soil, and to predict the states of different chemical species in the water, such as dissolved metals. pe values in water range from −12 to 25; the levels where the water itself becomes reduced or oxidized, respectively.

The reduction potentials in natural systems often lie comparatively near one of the boundaries of the stability region of water. Aerated surface water, rivers, lakes, oceans, rainwater, and acid mine water usually have oxidizing conditions (positive potentials). In places with limitations in air supply, such as submerged soils, swamps, and marine sediments, reducing conditions (negative potentials) are the norm. Intermediate values are rare and usually a temporary condition found in systems moving to higher or lower pe values.

In environmental situations, it is common to have complex non-equilibrium conditions between a large number of species, meaning that it is often not possible to make accurate and precise measurements of the reduction potential. However, it is usually possible to obtain an approximate value and define the conditions as being in the oxidizing or reducing regime.

In the soil there are two main redox constituents: anorganic redox systems (mainly ox/red compounds of Fe and Mn) and measurement in water extracts, and natural soil samples with all microbial and root components and measurement by direct method.

== Water quality ==
The oxido-reduction potential (ORP) can be used for the systems monitoring water quality with the advantage of a single-value measure for the disinfection potential, showing the effective activity of the disinfectant rather than the applied dose. For example, E. coli, Salmonella, Listeria, and other pathogens have survival times of less than 30 seconds when the ORP is above 665 mV, compared to more than 300 seconds when ORP is below 485 mV.

In 2009, a study was conducted comparing traditional parts per million (ppm) chlorination reading and ORP in Hennepin County, Minnesota. The results of this study presents arguments in favor of the inclusion of ORP above 650 mV in the local health regulation codes.

== Geochemistry and mineralogy ==
E_{h}–pH (Pourbaix) diagrams are commonly used in mining and geology for assessment of the stability fields of minerals and dissolved species. Under the conditions where a mineral (solid) phase is predicted to be the most stable form of an element, these diagrams show that mineral. As the predicted results are all from thermodynamic (at equilibrium state) evaluations, these diagrams should be used with caution. Although the formation of a mineral or its dissolution may be predicted to occur under a set of conditions, the process may practically be negligible because its rate is too slow. Consequently, kinetic evaluations at the same time are necessary. Nevertheless, the equilibrium conditions can be used to evaluate the direction of spontaneous changes and the magnitude of the driving force behind them.

== See also ==
- Electrochemical potential
- Electrolytic cell
- Electromotive force
- Fermi level
- Galvanic cell
- Oxygen radical absorbance capacity
- Redox gradient
- Solvated electron

== Additional notes ==
Onishi, j; Kondo W; Uchiyama Y (1960). "Preliminary report on the oxidation-reduction potential obtained on surfaces of gingiva and tongue and in interdental space". Bull Tokyo Med Dent Univ (7): 161.
