= Cell potential =

Cell potential may refer to:

- Electrode potential
- Membrane potential, the potential across the membrane of a biological cell
- Standard electrode potential
