= Table of standard reduction potentials for half-reactions important in biochemistry =

Standard apparent reduction potentials (E°') in biochemistry at pH 7

The values below are standard apparent reduction potentials (E°') for electro-biochemical half-reactions measured at 25 °C, 1 atmosphere and a pH of 7 in aqueous solution.

The actual physiological potential depends on the ratio of the reduced (Red) and oxidized (Ox) forms according to the Nernst equation and the thermal voltage.

When an oxidizer (Ox) accepts a number z of electrons ( e^{−}) to be converted in its reduced form (Red), the half-reaction is expressed as:

Ox + z e^{−} → Red

The reaction quotient (Q_{r}) is the ratio of the chemical activity (a_{i}) of the reduced form (the reductant, a_{Red}) to the activity of the oxidized form (the oxidant, a_{ox}). It is equal to the ratio of their concentrations (C_{i}) only if the system is sufficiently diluted and the activity coefficients (γ_{i}) are close to unity (a_{i} = γ_{i} C_{i}):

$$Q_r = \frac{a_\text{Red}}{a_\text{Ox}} = \frac{C_\text{Red}}{C_\text{Ox}}$$

The Nernst equation is a function of Q_{r} and can be written as follows:

$$E_\text{red} = E^\ominus_\text{red} - \frac{RT}{zF} \ln Q_r=E^\ominus_\text{red} - \frac{RT}{zF} \ln\frac{a_\text{Red}}{a_\text{Ox}}.$$

At chemical equilibrium, the reaction quotient Q_{r} of the product activity (a_{Red}) by the reagent activity (a_{Ox}) is equal to the equilibrium constant (K) of the half-reaction and in the absence of driving force (ΔG = 0) the potential (E_{red}) also becomes nul.

The numerically simplified form of the Nernst equation is expressed as:

$$E_\text{red} = E^\ominus_\text{red} - \frac{0.059\ V}{z} \log_{10}\frac{a_\text{Red}}{a_\text{Ox}}$$

Where $E^\ominus_\text{red}$ is the standard reduction potential of the half-reaction expressed versus the standard reduction potential of hydrogen. For standard conditions in electrochemistry (T = 25 °C, P = 1 atm and all concentrations being fixed at 1 mol/L, or 1 M) the standard reduction potential of hydrogen $E^{\ominus}_\text{red H+}$ is fixed at zero by convention as it serves of reference. The standard hydrogen electrode (SHE), with [ H^{+}] = 1 M works thus at a pH = 0.

At pH = 7, when [ H^{+}] = 10^{−7} M, the reduction potential $E_\text{red}$ of H^{+} differs from zero because it depends on pH.

Solving the Nernst equation for the half-reaction of reduction of two protons into hydrogen gas gives:

2 H^{+} + 2 e^{−} ⇌ H_{2}

$$E_\text{red} = E^{\ominus}_\text{red} - 0.05916 \ pH$$

$$E_\text{red} = 0 - \left(0.05916 \ \text{×} \ 7\right) = -0.414 \ V$$

In biochemistry and in biological fluids, at pH = 7, it is thus important to note that the reduction potential of the protons ( H^{+}) into hydrogen gas H_{2} is no longer zero as with the standard hydrogen electrode (SHE) at 1 M H^{+} (pH = 0) in classical electrochemistry, but that $E_\text{red} = -0.414\mathrm V$ versus the standard hydrogen electrode (SHE).

The same also applies for the reduction potential of oxygen:

O_{2} + 4 H^{+} + 4 e^{−} ⇌ 2 H_{2}O

For O_{2}, $E^{\ominus}_\text{red}$ = 1.229 V, so, applying the Nernst equation for pH = 7 gives:

$$E_\text{red} = E^{\ominus}_\text{red} - 0.05916 \ pH$$

$$E_\text{red} = 1.229 - \left(0.05916 \ \text{×} \ 7\right) = 0.815 \ V$$

For obtaining the values of the reduction potential at pH = 7 for the redox reactions relevant for biological systems, the same kind of conversion exercise is done using the corresponding Nernst equation expressed as a function of pH.

The conversion is simple, but care must be taken not to inadvertently mix reduction potential converted at pH = 7 with other data directly taken from tables referring to SHE (pH = 0).

== Expression of the Nernst equation as a function of pH ==
The $E_h$ and pH of a solution are related by the Nernst equation as commonly represented by a Pourbaix diagram ($E_h$ – pH plot). For a half cell equation, conventionally written as a reduction reaction (i.e., electrons accepted by an oxidant on the left side):

$$a \, A + b \, B + h \, \ce{H+} + z \, e^{-} \quad \ce{<=>} \quad c \, C + d \, D$$

The half-cell standard reduction potential $E^{\ominus}_\text{red}$ is given by

$$E^{\ominus}_\text{red} (\text{volt}) = -\frac{\Delta G^\ominus}{zF}$$

where $\Delta G^\ominus$ is the standard Gibbs free energy change, z is the number of electrons involved, and F is Faraday's constant. The Nernst equation relates pH and $E_h$:

$E_h = E_\text{red} = E^{\ominus}_\text{red} - \frac{0.05916}{z} \log\left(\frac{\{C\}^c\{D\}^d}{\{A\}^a\{B\}^b}\right) - \frac{0.05916\,h}{z} \text{pH}$

where curly braces { } indicate activities, and exponents are shown in the conventional manner.
This equation is the equation of a straight line for $E_h$ as a function of pH with a slope of $-0.05916\,\left(\frac{h}{z}\right)$ volt (pH has no units).

This equation predicts lower $E_h$ at higher pH values. This is observed for the reduction of O_{2} into H_{2}O, or OH^{−}, and for reduction of H^{+} into H_{2}.

== Formal standard reduction potential combined with the pH dependency ==
To obtain the reduction potential as a function of the measured concentrations of the redox-active species in solution, it is necessary to express the activities as a function of the concentrations.

$$E_h = E_\text{red} = E^{\ominus}_\text{red} - \frac{0.05916}{z} \log\left(\frac{\{C\}^c\{D\}^d}{\{A\}^a\{B\}^b}\right) - \frac{0.05916\,h}{z} \text{pH}$$

Given that the chemical activity denoted here by { } is the product of the activity coefficient γ by the concentration denoted by [ ]: a_{i} = γ_{i}·C_{i}, here expressed as {X} = γ_{x} [X] and {X}^{x} = (γ_{x})^{x} [X]^{x} and replacing the logarithm of a product by the sum of the logarithms (i.e., log (a·b) = log a + log b), the log of the reaction quotient ($Q_r$) (without {H^{+}} already isolated apart in the last term as h pH) expressed here above with activities { } becomes:

$$\log\left(\frac{\{C\}^c\{D\}^d}{\{A\}^a\{B\}^b}\right) = \log\left(\frac{\left({\gamma_\text{C}}\right)^c \left({\gamma_\text{D}}\right)^d}{\left({\gamma_\text{A}}\right)^a \left({\gamma_\text{B}}\right)^b}\right)+ \log\left(\frac{\left[C\right]^c\left[D\right]^d}{\left[A\right]^a\left[B\right]^b}\right)$$

It allows to reorganize the Nernst equation as:

$$E_h = E_\text{red} = \underbrace{\left(E^{\ominus}_\text{red} - \frac{0.05916}{z} \log\left(\frac{\left({\gamma_\text{C}}\right)^c \left({\gamma_\text{D}}\right)^d}{\left({\gamma_\text{A}}\right)^a \left({\gamma_\text{B}}\right)^b}\right)\right)}_{E^{\ominus '}_\text{red}} - \frac{0.05916}{z} \log\left(\frac{\left[C\right]^c\left[D\right]^d}{\left[A\right]^a\left[B\right]^b}\right) - \frac{0.05916\,h}{z} \text{pH}$$

$$E_h = E_\text{red} = E^{\ominus '}_\text{red} - \frac{0.05916}{z} \log\left(\frac{\left[C\right]^c\left[D\right]^d}{\left[A\right]^a\left[B\right]^b}\right) - \frac{0.05916\,h}{z} \text{pH}$$

Where $E^{\ominus '}_\text{red}$ is the formal standard potential independent of pH including the activity coefficients.

Combining $E^{\ominus '}_\text{red}$ directly with the last term depending on pH gives:

$$E_h = E_\text{red} = \left(E^{\ominus '}_\text{red} - \frac{0.05916\,h}{z} \text{pH} \right)- \frac{0.05916}{z} \log\left(\frac{\left[C\right]^c\left[D\right]^d}{\left[A\right]^a\left[B\right]^b}\right)$$

For a pH = 7:

$$E_h = E_\text{red} = \underbrace{\left(E^{\ominus '}_\text{red} - \frac{0.05916\,h}{z} \text{× 7} \right)}_{E^{\ominus '}_\text{red apparent at pH 7}} - \frac{0.05916}{z} \log\left(\frac{\left[C\right]^c\left[D\right]^d}{\left[A\right]^a\left[B\right]^b}\right)$$

So,

$$E_h = E_\text{red} = E^{\ominus '}_\text{red apparent at pH 7} - \frac{0.05916}{z} \log\left(\frac{\left[C\right]^c\left[D\right]^d}{\left[A\right]^a\left[B\right]^b}\right)$$

It is therefore important to know to what exact definition does refer the value of a reduction potential for a given biochemical redox process reported at pH = 7, and to correctly understand the relationship used.

Is it simply:

- $E_h = E_\text{red}$ calculated at pH 7 (with or without corrections for the activity coefficients),
- $E^{\ominus '}_\text{red}$, a formal standard reduction potential including the activity coefficients but no pH calculations, or, is it,
- $E^{\ominus '}_\text{red apparent at pH 7}$, an apparent formal standard reduction potential at pH 7 in given conditions and also depending on the ratio $\frac{h} {z} = \frac{\text{(number of involved protons)}} {\text{(number of exchanged electrons)}}$.

This requires thus to dispose of a clear definition of the considered reduction potential, and of a sufficiently detailed description of the conditions in which it is valid, along with a complete expression of the corresponding Nernst equation. Were also the reported values only derived from thermodynamic calculations, or determined from experimental measurements and under what specific conditions? Without being able to correctly answering these questions, mixing data from different sources without appropriate conversion can lead to errors and confusion.

== Determination of the formal standard reduction potential when C_{red}/C_{ox} = 1 ==
The formal standard reduction potential $E^{\ominus '}_\text{red}$ can be defined as the measured reduction potential $E_\text{red}$ of the half-reaction at unity concentration ratio of the oxidized and reduced species (i.e., when C_{red}/C_{ox} = 1) under given conditions.

Indeed:

as, $E_\text{red} = E^{\ominus}_\text{red}$, when $\frac{a_\text{red}} {a_\text{ox}} = 1$,

$E_\text{red} = E^{\ominus'}_\text{red}$, when $\frac{C_\text{red}} {C_\text{ox}} = 1$,

because $\ln{1} = 0$, and that the term $\frac{\gamma_\text{red}} {\gamma_\text{ox}}$ is included in $E^{\ominus '}_\text{red}$.

The formal reduction potential makes possible to more simply work with molar or molal concentrations in place of activities. Because molar and molal concentrations were once referred as formal concentrations, it could explain the origin of the adjective formal in the expression formal potential.

The formal potential is thus the reversible potential of an electrode at equilibrium immersed in a solution where reactants and products are at unit concentration. If any small incremental change of potential causes a change in the direction of the reaction, i.e. from reduction to oxidation or vice versa, the system is close to equilibrium, reversible and is at its formal potential. When the formal potential is measured under standard conditions (i.e. the activity of each dissolved species is 1 mol/L, T = 298.15 K = 25 °C = 77 °F, P_{gas} = 1 bar) it becomes de facto a standard potential. According to Brown and Swift (1949), "A formal potential is defined as the potential of a half-cell, measured against the standard hydrogen electrode, when the total concentration of each oxidation state is one formal".

The activity coefficients $\gamma_{red}$ and $\gamma_{ox}$ are included in the formal potential $E^{\ominus '}_\text{red}$, and because they depend on experimental conditions such as temperature, ionic strength, and pH, $E^{\ominus '}_\text{red}$ cannot be referred as an immuable standard potential but needs to be systematically determined for each specific set of experimental conditions.

Formal reduction potentials are applied to simplify results interpretations and calculations of a considered system. Their relationship with the standard reduction potentials must be clearly expressed to avoid any confusion.

== Main factors affecting the formal (or apparent) standard reduction potentials ==
The main factor affecting the formal (or apparent) reduction potentials $E^{\ominus '}_\text{red}$ in biochemical or biological processes is the pH. To determine approximate values of formal reduction potentials, neglecting in a first approach changes in activity coefficients due to ionic strength, the Nernst equation has to be applied taking care to first express the relationship as a function of pH. The second factor to be considered are the values of the concentrations taken into account in the Nernst equation. To define a formal reduction potential for a biochemical reaction, the pH value, the concentrations values and the hypotheses made on the activity coefficients must always be clearly indicated. When using, or comparing, several formal (or apparent) reduction potentials they must also be internally consistent.

Problems may occur when mixing different sources of data using different conventions or approximations (i.e., with different underlying hypotheses). When working at the frontier between inorganic and biological processes (e.g., when comparing abiotic and biotic processes in geochemistry when microbial activity could also be at work in the system), care must be taken not to inadvertently directly mix standard reduction potentials ($E^{\ominus}_\text{red}$ versus SHE, pH = 0) with formal (or apparent) reduction potentials ($E^{\ominus'}_\text{red}$ at pH = 7). Definitions must be clearly expressed and carefully controlled, especially if the sources of data are different and arise from different fields (e.g., picking and directly mixing data from classical electrochemistry textbooks ($E^{\ominus}_\text{red}$ versus SHE, pH = 0) and microbiology textbooks ($E^{\ominus'}_\text{red}$ at pH = 7) without paying attention to the conventions on which they are based).

== Example in biochemistry ==
For example, in a two electrons couple like NAD^{+}:NADH the reduction potential becomes ~ 30 mV (or more exactly, 59.16 mV/2 = 29.6 mV) more positive for every power of ten increase in the ratio of the oxidised to the reduced form.

== Some important apparent potentials used in biochemistry ==
Half-reaction	E°' (V)	E' Physiological conditions	References and notes
CH_{3}COOH + 2H^{+} + 2e^{−} → CH_{3}CHO + H_{2}O	−0.58		Many carboxylic acid: aldehyde redox reactions have a potential near this value
2 H^{+} + 2 e^{−} → H_{2}	−0.41		Non-zero value for the hydrogen potential because at pH = 7, [H^{+}] = 10^{−7} M and not 1 M as in the standard hydrogen electrode (SHE), and that: E_{red} = −0.059 V × 7 = −0.41 V
NADP^{+} + H^{+} + 2e^{−} → NADPH	−0.320	−0.370	The ratio of NADP^{+}:NADPH is maintained at around 1:50. This allows NADPH to be used to reduce organic molecules
NAD^{+} + H^{+} + 2e^{−} → NADH	−0.320	−0.280	The ratio of NAD^{+}:NADH is maintained at around 30:1. This allows NAD^{+} to be used to oxidise organic molecules
FAD + 2 H^{+} + 2 e^{−} → FADH_{2} (coenzyme bonded to flavoproteins)	−0.22		Depending on the protein involved, the potential of the flavine can vary widely
Pyruvate + 2 H^{+} + 2 e^{−} → Lactate	−0.19		
Oxaloacetate + 2 H^{+} + 2 e^{−} → Malate	−0.17		While under standard conditions malate cannot reduce the more electronegative NAD^{+}:NADH couple, in the cell the concentration of oxaloacetate is kept low enough that Malate dehydrogenase can reduce NAD^{+} to NADH during the citric acid cycle.
Fumarate + 2 H^{+} + 2 e^{−} → Succinate	+0.03		
O_{2} + 2H^{+} + 2e^{−} → H_{2}O_{2}	+0.30		Formation of hydrogen peroxide from oxygen
O_{2} + 4H^{+} + 4e^{−} → 2H_{2}O	+0.82		In classical electrochemistry, E° for O_{2} = +1.23 V with respect to the standard hydrogen electrode (SHE). At pH = 7, E_{red} = 1.23 − 0.059 V × 7 = +0.82 V
P680^{+} + e^{−} → P680	~ +1.0		Half-reaction independent of pH as no H^{+} is involved in the reaction

== See also ==
- Nernst equation
- Electron bifurcation
- Pourbaix diagram
- Reduction potential
  - Dependency of reduction potential on pH
- Standard electrode potential
- Standard reduction potential
- Standard reduction potential (data page)
- Standard state

== Bibliography ==
Electrochemistry

- Bard, Allen J.; Faulkner, Larry R.; White, Henry S. (2022). Electrochemical Methods: Fundamentals and Applications, 3rd Edition. Wiley. p. 864. ISBN 978-1-119-33406-4.

Bio-electrochemistry

- IUPAC–IUB–IUPAB Interunion Commission of Biothermodynamics (1976). "Recommendations for measurement and presentation of biochemical equilibrium data". J. Biol. Chem. 251 (22): 6879–85. doi:10.1016/S0021-9258(17)32917-4.
- Loach, Paul A. (1976). "Oxidation-reduction potentials, absorbance bands and molar absorbance of compounds used in biochemical studies" (PDF). Fasman GD, Editor. 1: 122–130.
- Alberty, Robert A. (1998). "Calculation of standard transformed formation properties of biochemical reactants and standard apparent reduction potentials of half reactions". Archives of Biochemistry and Biophysics. 358 (1): 25–39. doi:10.1006/abbi.1998.0831. ISSN 0003-9861. PMID 9750161.
- Alberty, Robert A. (2001). "Standard apparent reduction potentials for biochemical half reactions as a function of pH and ionic strength". Archives of Biochemistry and Biophysics. 389 (1): 94–109. doi:10.1006/abbi.2001.2318. ISSN 0003-9861. PMID 11370677.
- Alberty, Robert A. (2004). "Standard apparent reduction potentials of biochemical half reactions and thermodynamic data on the species involved". Biophysical Chemistry. 111 (2): 115–122. doi:10.1016/j.bpc.2004.05.003. ISSN 0301-4622. PMID 15381309.
- Kano, Kenji (2002). "Redox potentials of proteins and other compounds of bioelectrochemical interest in aqueous solutions". Review of Polarography. 48 (1): 29–46. doi:10.5189/revpolarography.48.29. eISSN 1884-7692. ISSN 0034-6691.

Microbiology

- Madigan, Michael T.; Martinko, John M.; Dunlap, Paul V.; Clark, David P. (2009). Brock Biology of Microorganisms (12th ed.). San Francisco, CA: Pearson/Benjamin Cummings. ISBN 978-0-13-232460-1.
- Madigan, Michael; Bender, Kelly; Buckley, Daniel; Sattley, W.; Stahl, David (2017). Brock Biology of Microorganisms (15th ed.). New York, NY: Pearson. ISBN 978-0-13-426192-8.
