= PZC =

PZC may refer to:

- Point of zero charge, a concept relating to the phenomenon of adsorption in physical chemistry
- Provinciale Zeeuwse Courant, a Dutch newspaper for the region of Zeeland
- Providence Zen Center, the international headquarters for the Kwan Um School of Zen
- PZ Cussons, a manufacturer of personal healthcare products and consumer goods
