= Mixed potential theory =

Theory in electrochemistry

Mixed potential theory is a theory used in electrochemistry that relates the potentials and currents from differing constituents into a 'weighted' potential at zero net current. In other words, it is an electrode potential resulting from a simultaneous action of more than a single redox couple, while the net electrode current is zero.

== IUPAC definition ==
According to the IUPAC definition, mixed potential is the potential of an electrode (against a suitable reference electrode, often the standard hydrogen electrode) when an appreciable fraction of the anodic or cathodic current arises from two or more different redox couples, but when the total current on the electrode remains at zero.
