= Point of zero charge =

pH value where the surface of a colloidal solid carries no net electrical charge

Electrical double layer around a negatively charged particle in suspension in water.

The point of zero charge (pzc) is generally described as the pH at which the net electrical charge of the particle surface (i.e. adsorbent's surface) is equal to zero. This concept has been introduced in the studies dealing with colloidal flocculation to explain why pH is affecting the phenomenon.

A related concept in electrochemistry is the electrode potential at the point of zero charge. Generally, the pzc in electrochemistry is the value of the negative decimal logarithm of the activity of the potential-determining ion in the bulk fluid. The pzc is of fundamental importance in surface science. For example, in the field of environmental science, it determines how easily a substrate is able to adsorb potentially harmful ions. It also has countless applications in technology of colloids, e.g., flotation of minerals. Therefore, the pzc value has been examined in many application of adsorption to the environmental science. The pzc value is typically obtained by titrations and several titration methods have been developed. Related values associated with the soil characteristics exist along with the pzc value, including zero point of charge (zpc), point of zero net charge (pznc), etc.

== Term definition of point of zero charge ==
The point of zero charge is the pH value for which the net surface charge of adsorbent is equal to zero. This concept has been introduced by an increase of interest in the pH of the solution during adsorption experiments. The reason is that the adsorption of some substances is very dependent on pH. The pzc value is determined by the characteristics of an adsorbent. For example, the surface charge of adsorbent is described by the ion that lies on the surface of the particle (adsorbent) structure like image. At a lower pH, hydrogen ions (protons, H^{+}) would be more adsorbed than other cations (adsorbate) so that the other cations would be less adsorbed than in the case of the negatively charged particle. On the other hand, if the surface is positively charged and pH is increased, anions will be less adsorbed as pH increases. From the view of the adsorbent, if the pH of the solution is below the pzc value, the surface charge of the adsorbent would become positive so that the anions can be adsorbed. Conversely, if the pH is above the pzc value, the surface charge would be negative so that the cations can be adsorbed.

For example, the electrical charge on the surface of silver iodide (AgI) crystals can be determined by the concentration of iodide ions present in the solution above the crystals. Then, the pzc value of the AgI surface will be described by a function of the concentration of I^{−} in the solution (or by the negative decimal logarithm of this concentration, -log_{10} [I^{–}] = pI^{−}).

== Relation of pzc to isoelectric point ==
The pzc is the same as the isoelectric point (iep) if there is no adsorption of other ions than the potential determining H^{+}/OH^{−} at the surface. This is often the case for pure ("pristine surface") oxides in suspension in water. In the presence of specific adsorption, pzc and isoelectric point generally have different values.

== Method of experimental determination ==
The pzc is typically obtained by acid-base titrations of colloidal dispersions while monitoring the electrophoretic mobility of the particles and the pH of the suspension. Several titrations are required to distinguish pzc from iep, using different supporting electrolytes (including varying the electrolyte ionic strength). Once satisfactory curves are obtained (acid/base amount—pH, and pH—zeta potential), the pzc is established as the common intersection point (cip) of the lines. Therefore, pzc is also sometimes referred to as cip.

== Related abbreviations ==
Besides pzc, iep, and cip, there are also numerous other terms used in the literature, usually expressed as initialisms, with identical or (confusingly) near-identical meaning: zero point of charge (zpc), point of zero net charge (pznc), point of zero net proton charge (pznpc), pristine point of zero charge (ppzc), point of zero salt effect (pzse), zero point of titration (zpt) of colloidal dispersion, and isoelectric point of the solid (ieps) and point of zero surface tension (pzst or pzs).

== Application in electrochemistry ==
In electrochemistry, the electrode-electrolyte interface is generally charged. If the electrode is polarizable, then its surface charge depends on the electrode potential.

IUPAC defines the potential at the point of zero charge as the potential of an electrode (against a defined reference electrode) at which one of the charges defined is zero.

The potential of zero charge is used for determination of the absolute electrode potential in a given electrolyte.

IUPAC also defines the potential difference with respect to the potential of zero charge as:

E_{pzc} = E − E_{σ=0}

where:

- E_{pzc} is the electrode potential difference with respect to the point of zero charge, E_{σ=0}
- E is the potential of the same electrode against a defined reference electrode in volts
- E_{σ=0} is the potential of the same electrode when the surface charge is zero, in the absence of specific adsorption other than that of the solvent, against the reference electrode as used above, in volts

The structure of electrolyte at the electrode surface can also depend on the surface charge, with a change around the pzc potential. For example, on a platinum electrode, water molecules have been reported to be weakly hydrogen-bonded with "oxygen-up" orientation on negatively charged surfaces, and strongly hydrogen-bonded with nearly flat orientation at positively charged surfaces.

At pzc, the colloidal system exhibits zero zeta potential (that is, the particles remain stationary in an electric field), minimum stability (exhibits maximum coagulation or flocculation rate), maximum solubility of the solid phase, maximum viscosity of the dispersion, and other peculiarities.

== Application in environmental geochemistry ==
In the field of environmental science, adsorption is involved in many techniques that can eliminate pollutants and governs the concentration of chemicals in soils and/or atmosphere. When studying pollutant degradation or a sorption process, it is important to examine the pzc value related to adsorption. For example, natural and organic substrates including wood ash, sawdust, etc. are used as an adsorbent by eliminating harmful heavy metals like arsenic, cobalt, mercury ion and so forth in contaminated neutral drainage (CND), which is a passive reactor that could possible metal adsorption with low-cost materials. Therefore, the pzc values of the organic substrates were evaluated to optimize the selection of materials in CND. Another example is that the emission of nitrous acid, which controls the atmosphere's oxidative capacity. Different soil pH leads to the different surface charges of minerals so the emission of nitrous acid would be varied, further impacting on the biological cycle involved in the nitrous acid species.
