= Half-reaction =

Redox reaction component

In chemistry, a half reaction (or half-cell reaction) is either the oxidation or reduction reaction component of a redox reaction. A half reaction is obtained by considering the change in oxidation states of individual substances involved in the redox reaction. Often, the concept of half reactions is used to describe what occurs in an electrochemical cell, such as a Galvanic cell battery at one of the two electrodes.

In the case of metal plating and metal stripping the same half reaction can be written to describe both the metal undergoing oxidation (known as the anode) and the metal undergoing reduction (known as the cathode).

Half reactions are often used as a method of balancing redox reactions. For oxidation-reduction reactions in acidic conditions, after balancing the atoms and oxidation numbers, H^{+} ions must be added to balance the hydrogen ions in the half reaction. For oxidation-reduction reactions in basic conditions, after balancing the atoms and oxidation numbers, it must be treated as an acidic solution, and then OH^{−} ions must be added to balance the H^{+} ions in the half reactions (which would give H_{2}O).

== Example: Zn and Cu galvanic cell ==
Galvanic cell

The Galvanic cell shown in the adjacent image is constructed with a piece of zinc (Zn) submerged in a solution of zinc sulfate (ZnSO_{4}) and a piece of copper (Cu) submerged in a solution of copper(II) sulfate (CuSO_{4}).

The overall reaction is:

Zn(s) + CuSO_{4}(aq) → ZnSO_{4}(aq) + Cu(s)

At the Zn anode, oxidation takes place, meaning the metal loses electrons. This is represented in the following oxidation half reaction (with the electrons on the product side):

Zn(s) → Zn^{2+} + 2 e^{−}

At the Cu cathode, reduction takes place, meaning electrons are gained or accepted. This is represented in the following reduction half reaction (with the electrons on the reactant side):

Cu^{2+} + 2 e^{−} → Cu(s)

== Example: oxidation of magnesium ==
Experiment showing synthesis of a basic oxide. Magnesium ribbon is ignited by burner. Magnesium burns, emitting intense light and forming magnesium oxide (MgO).

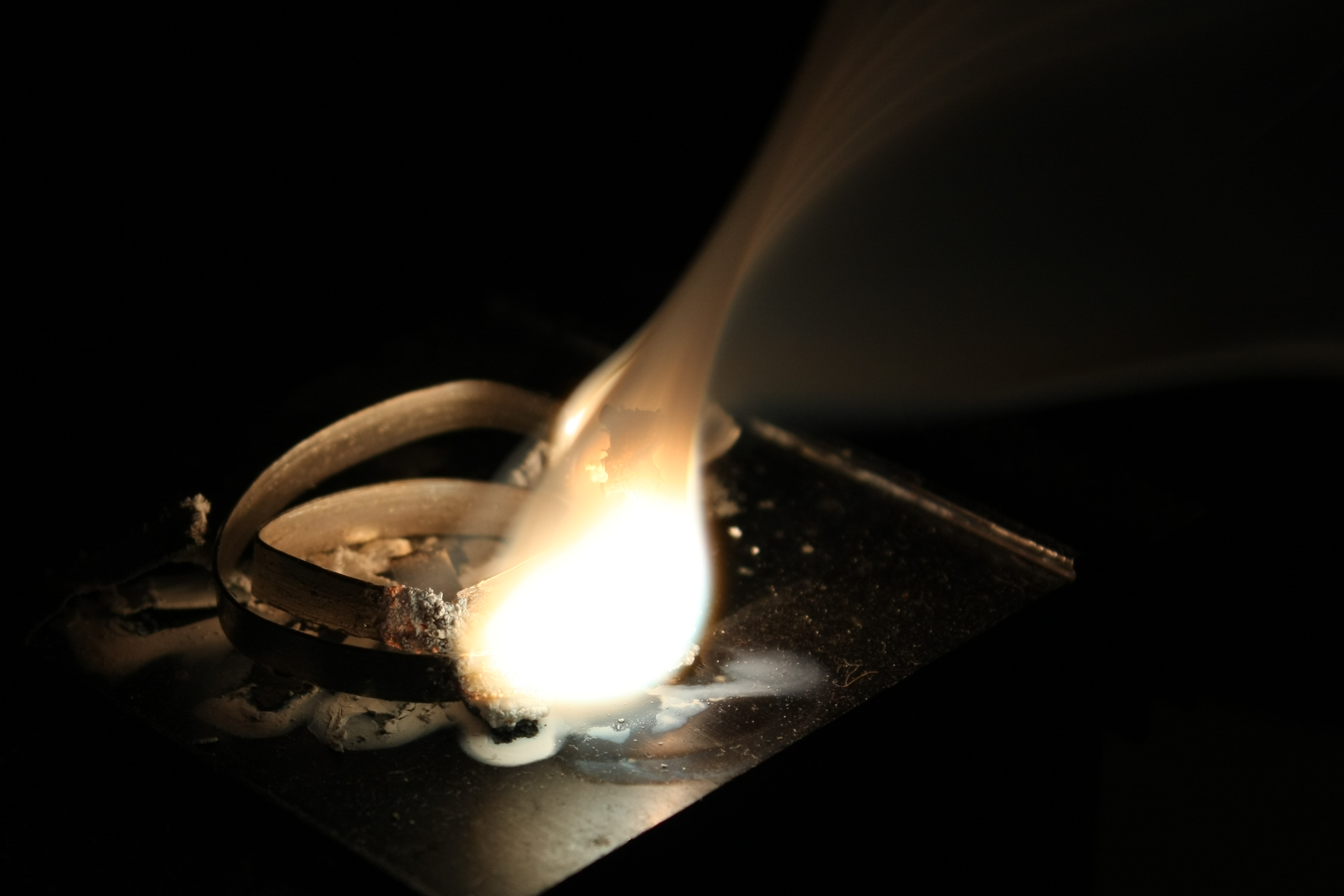
A burning magnesium ribbon; the magnesium oxide is visible, with a different texture and color, at the burning edge of the ribbon

Consider the example burning of magnesium ribbon (Mg). When magnesium burns, it combines with oxygen (O_{2}) from the air to form magnesium oxide (MgO) according to the following equation:

2 Mg(s) + O_{2}(g) → 2 MgO(s)

Magnesium oxide is an ionic compound containing Mg^{2+} and O^{2−} ions whereas Mg(s) and O_{2}(g) are elements with no charges. The Mg(s) with zero charge gains a +2 charge going from the reactant side to product side, and the O_{2}(g) with zero charge gains a −2 charge. This is because when Mg(s) becomes Mg^{2+}, it loses 2 electrons. Since there are 2 Mg on left side, a total of 4 electrons are lost according to the following oxidation half reaction:

2 Mg(s) → 2 Mg^{2+} + 4 e^{−}

On the other hand, O_{2} was reduced: its oxidation state goes from 0 to −2. Thus, a reduction half reaction can be written for the O_{2} as it gains 4 electrons:

O_{2}(g) + 4 e^{−} → 2 O^{2−}

The overall reaction is the sum of both half reactions:

2 Mg(s) + O_{2}(g) + 4 e^{−} → 2 Mg^{2+} + 2 O^{2−} + 4 e^{−}

When a chemical reaction, especially a redox reaction, takes place, the naked eye cannot see the electrons as they appear and disappear during the course of the reaction. Instead, observers see the reactants and end products. Due to this, electrons appearing on both sides of the equation are canceled. After canceling, the equation is re-written as

2 Mg(s) + O_{2}(g) → 2 Mg^{2+} + 2 O^{2−}

Two ions, positive (Mg^{2+}) and negative (O^{2−}), exist on product side, and they combine immediately to form the magnesium oxide (MgO) compound due to their opposite charges (electrostatic attraction). In any given oxidation-reduction reaction, there are two half reactions: the oxidation half reaction and the reduction half reaction. The sum of these two half reactions is the oxidation–reduction reaction.

== Half-reaction balancing method ==
In the redox reaction between iron and chlorine:

Cl_{2} + 2 Fe^{2+} → 2 Cl^{−} + 2 Fe^{3+}

The two elements involved, iron and chlorine, each change oxidation state; iron from +2 to +3, chlorine from 0 to −1. There are then effectively two half reactions occurring. These changes can be represented in formulas by inserting appropriate electrons into each half reaction:

Fe^{2+} → Fe^{3+} + e^{−}
Cl_{2} + 2 e^{−} → 2 Cl^{−}

Given two half reactions it is possible, with knowledge of appropriate electrode potentials, to arrive at the complete (original) reaction the same way. The decomposition of a reaction into half reactions is key to understanding a variety of chemical processes. For example, in the above reaction, it can be shown that this is a redox reaction in which Fe is oxidised, and Cl is reduced (so there is a transfer of electrons from Fe to Cl). Decomposition is also a way to simplify the balancing of a chemical equation. A chemist can atom balance and charge balance one piece of an equation at a time.

For example:

- Fe^{2+} → Fe^{3+} + e^{−} becomes 2 Fe^{2+} → 2 Fe^{3+} + 2e^{−}
- is added to Cl_{2} + 2 e^{−} → 2 Cl^{−}
- and finally becomes Cl_{2} + 2 Fe^{2+} → 2 Cl^{−} + 2 Fe^{3+}

=== Basic and acidic conditions ===
It is also possible–sometimes necessary–to consider a half reaction in either basic or acidic conditions, as there may be an acidic or basic electrolyte involved in the redox reaction. Due to this electrolyte, it may be more difficult to satisfy the balance of both the atoms and charges; this is done by adding H_{2}O, OH^{−}, e^{−}, and/or H^{+} to either side of the reaction until both atoms and charges are balanced.

For the half reaction below:

PbO_{2} → PbO

OH^{−}, H_{2}O, and e^{−} can be used to balance the charges and atoms in basic conditions, as long as it is assumed that the reaction is in water.

2 e^{−} + H_{2}O + PbO_{2} → PbO + 2 OH^{−}

For the half reaction below:

PbO_{2} → PbO

H^{+}, H_{2}O, and e^{−} can be used to balance the charges and atoms in acidic conditions, as long as it is assumed that the reaction is in water.

2 e^{−} + 2 H^{+} + PbO_{2} → PbO + H_{2}O

Both sides are charge balanced, meaning the overall charge is neutral, and atom balanced, meaning there are equal numbers of each element on both sides.

Often there will be both H^{+} and OH^{−} present in acidic and basic conditions, but the resulting reaction of the two ions will yield water.

H^{+} + OH^{−} → H_{2}O

== See also ==
- Electrode potential
- Standard electrode potential (data page)
- Half-cell
