= Standard electrode potential =

Electromotive force of a half reaction cell versus standard hydrogen electrode

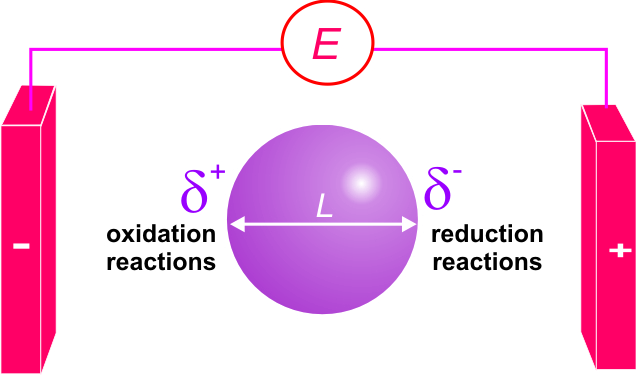
Bipolar electrochemistry scheme

In electrochemistry, standard electrode potential E^{⦵} or E^{⦵}_{red}, is the electrode potential (a measure of the reducing power of any element or compound) which the IUPAC "Gold Book" defines as "the value of the standard emf (electromotive force) of a cell in which molecular hydrogen under standard pressure is oxidized to solvated protons at the left-hand electrode".

== Background ==
The basis for an electrochemical cell, such as the galvanic cell, is always a redox reaction which can be broken down into two half-reactions: oxidation at anode (loss of electron) and reduction at cathode (gain of electron). Electricity is produced due to the difference of electric potential between the individual potentials of the two metal electrodes with respect to the electrolyte.

Although the overall potential of a cell can be measured, there is no simple way to accurately measure the electrode/electrolyte potentials in isolation. The electric potential also varies with temperature, concentration and pressure. Since the oxidation potential of a half-reaction is the negative of the reduction potential in a redox reaction, it is sufficient to calculate either one of the potentials. Therefore, standard electrode potential is commonly written as standard reduction potential.

== Calculation ==
The galvanic cell potential results from the voltage difference of a pair of electrodes. It is not possible to measure an absolute value for each electrode separately. However, the potential of a reference electrode, standard hydrogen electrode (SHE), is defined as to 0.00 V. An electrode with unknown electrode potential can be paired with either the standard hydrogen electrode, or another electrode whose potential has already been measured, to determine its "absolute" potential.

Since the electrode potentials are conventionally defined as reduction potentials, the sign of the potential for the metal electrode being oxidized must be reversed when calculating the overall cell potential. The electrode potentials are independent of the number of electrons transferred —they are expressed in volts, which measure energy per electron transferred—and so the two electrode potentials can be simply combined to give the overall cell potential even if different numbers of electrons are involved in the two electrode reactions.

For practical measurements, the electrode in question is connected to the positive terminal of the electrometer, while the standard hydrogen electrode is connected to the negative terminal.

== Reversible electrode ==
A reversible electrode is an electrode that owes its potential to changes of a reversible nature. A first condition to be fulfilled is that the system is close to the chemical equilibrium. A second set of conditions is that the system is submitted to very small solicitations spread on a sufficient period of time so, that the chemical equilibrium conditions nearly always prevail. In theory, it is very difficult to experimentally achieve reversible conditions because any perturbation imposed to a system near equilibrium in a finite time forces it out of equilibrium. However, if the solicitations exerted on the system are sufficiently small and applied slowly, one can consider an electrode to be reversible. By nature, electrode reversibility depends on the experimental conditions and the way the electrode is operated. For example, electrodes used in electroplating are operated with a high over-potential to force the reduction of a given metal cation to be deposited onto a metallic surface to be protected. Such a system is far from equilibrium and continuously submitted to important and constant changes in a short period of time

== Standard reduction potential table ==
The larger the value of the standard reduction potential, the easier it is for the element to be reduced (gain electrons); in other words, they are better oxidizing agents.

For example, F_{2}(g) has a standard reduction potential of +2.87 V and Li^{+}(aq) has −3.05 V:

F_{2}(g) + 2 e^{−} ⇌ 2 F^{−}(aq) = +2.87 V
Li^{+}(aq) + e^{−} ⇌ Li(s) = −3.05 V

The highly positive standard reduction potential of F_{2}(g) means it is reduced easily and is therefore a good oxidizing agent. In contrast, the greatly negative standard reduction potential of Li^{+}(aq) indicates that it is not easily reduced. Instead, Li(s) would rather undergo oxidation (hence it is a good reducing agent).

A further example: Zn^{2+}(aq) + 2 e^{−} ⇌ Zn(s) has a standard reduction potential of −0.76 V and thus:

- Zn(s) can be oxidized by any other electrode whose standard reduction potential is greater than −0.76 V e.g., 2 H^{+}(aq) + 2 e^{−} ⇌ H_{2}(g) (0 V), Cu^{2+}(aq) + 2 e^{−} ⇌ Cu(s) (0.34 V), F_{2}(g) + 2 e^{−} ⇌ 2 F^{−}(aq) (2.87 V)
- Zn^{2+}(aq) can be reduced by any electrode with standard reduction potential less than −0.76 V e.g. H^{−}(aq) (H_{2}(g) + 2 e^{−} ⇌ 2 H^{−}(aq) (−2.23 V)), Na(s) (Na^{+}(aq) + e^{−} ⇌ Na(s) (−2.71 V)), Li(s) (Li^{+}(aq) + e^{−} ⇌ Li(s) (−3.05 V)).

In a galvanic cell, where a spontaneous redox reaction drives the cell to produce an electric potential, Gibbs free energy ΔG^{⦵} must be negative, in accordance with the following equation:

Δ_{cell}G^{⦵} = -nFE^{⦵}_{cell}

where n is number of moles of electrons per mole of products and F is the Faraday constant, ~ 96 485 C/mol.

As such, the following rules apply:

If E^{⦵}_{cell} > 0, then the process is spontaneous (galvanic cell): Δ_{cell}G^{⦵} < 0, and energy is liberated.

If E^{⦵}_{cell} < 0, then the process is non-spontaneous (electrolytic cell): Δ_{cell}G^{⦵} > 0, and energy is consumed.

Thus in order to have a spontaneous reaction (Δ_{cell}G^{⦵} < 0), E^{⦵}_{cell} must be positive, where:

E^{⦵}_{cell} = E^{⦵}_{cathode} - E^{⦵}_{anode}

where E^{⦵}_{cathode} is the standard potential (E^{⦵}_{red}) at the cathode (called the standard cathodic potential or standard reduction potential) and E^{⦵}_{anode} is the standard potential (E^{⦵}_{red}) at the anode (called the standard anodic potential or standard oxidation potential) as given in the table of standard electrode potential.

== See also ==
- Nernst equation
- Pourbaix diagram
- Solvated electron
- Standard electrode potential (data page)
- Standard hydrogen electrode (SHE)
- Biochemically relevant redox potentials (data page)
