= Standard electrode potential (data page) =

Data values of standard electrode potential

The data below tabulates standard electrode potentials (E^{⦵}_{red}), in volts relative to the standard hydrogen electrode (SHE), at:

- Temperature 298.15 K (25.00 °C; 77.00 °F);
- Effective concentration (activity) 1 mol/dm^{3} for each aqueous or amalgamated (mercury-alloyed) species;
- Unit activity for each solvent and pure solid or liquid species; and
- Absolute partial pressure 101.325 kPa (1.00000 atm; 1.01325 bar) for each gaseous reagent — the convention in most literature data but not the current standard state (100 kPa (0.99 atm; 1.0 bar)).

Variations from these ideal conditions affect measured voltage via the Nernst equation.

== Table of standard electrode potentials ==
Legend: (s) – solid; (l) – liquid; (g) – gas; (aq) – aqueous (default for all charged species); (Hg) – amalgam; bold – water electrolysis equations.

Element	Half-reaction			E^{⦵}_{red} /V	Electrons transferred	Reference
Element	Oxidant	⇌	Reductant	E^{⦵}_{red} /V	Electrons transferred	Reference
Sr	Sr^{+} + e^{–}	⇌	Sr(s)	−4.101	1	
Ca	Ca^{+} + e^{–}	⇌	Ca(s)	−3.8	1	
Th	Th^{4+} + e^{–}	⇌	Th^{3+}	−3.6	1	
Pr	Pr^{3+} + e^{–}	⇌	Pr^{2+}	−3.1	1	Estimated
N	3 N_{2}(g) + 2 H^{+} + 2 e^{–}	⇌	2 HN_{3}(aq)	−3.09	2	
Li	Li^{+} + e^{–}	⇌	Li(s)	−3.0401	1	
N	N_{2}(g) + 4 H_{2}O + 2 e^{–}	⇌	2 NH_{2}OH(aq) + 2 OH^{−}	−3.04	2	
Cs	Cs^{+} + e^{–}	⇌	Cs(s)	−3.026	1	
Ca	Ca(OH)_{2} + 2 e^{–}	⇌	Ca(s) + 2 OH^{−}	−3.02	2	
Er	Er^{3+} + e^{–}	⇌	Er^{2+}	−3	1	
Ba	Ba(OH)_{2} + 2 e^{–}	⇌	Ba(s) + 2 OH^{−}	−2.99	2	
Rb	Rb^{+} + e^{–}	⇌	Rb(s)	−2.98	1	
K	K^{+} + e^{–}	⇌	K(s)	−2.931	1	
Ba	Ba^{2+} + 2 e^{–}	⇌	Ba(s)	−2.912	2	
La	La(OH)_{3}(s) + 3 e^{–}	⇌	La(s) + 3 OH^{−}	−2.9	3	
Fr	Fr^{+} + e^{–}	⇌	Fr(s)	−2.9	1	
Sr	Sr^{2+} + 2 e^{–}	⇌	Sr(s)	−2.899	2	
Sr	Sr(OH)_{2} + 2 e^{–}	⇌	Sr(s) + 2 OH^{−}	−2.88	2	
Ca	Ca^{2+} + 2 e^{–}	⇌	Ca(s)	−2.868	2	
Li	Li^{+} + C_{6}(s) + e^{–}	⇌	LiC_{6}(s)	−2.84	1	
Eu	Eu^{2+} + 2 e^{–}	⇌	Eu(s)	−2.812	2	
Ra	Ra^{2+} + 2 e^{–}	⇌	Ra(s)	−2.8	2	
Ho	Ho^{3+} + e^{–}	⇌	Ho^{2+}	−2.8	1	
Bk	Bk^{3+} + e^{–}	⇌	Bk^{2+}	−2.8	1	
Yb	Yb^{2+} + 2 e^{–}	⇌	Yb(s)	−2.76	2	
Na	Na^{+} + e^{–}	⇌	Na(s)	−2.71	1	
Mg	Mg^{+} + e^{–}	⇌	Mg(s)	−2.7	1	
Nd	Nd^{3+} + e^{–}	⇌	Nd^{2+}	−2.7	1	
Mg	Mg(OH)_{2} + 2 e^{–}	⇌	Mg(s) + 2 OH^{−}	−2.69	2	
Sm	Sm^{2+} + 2 e^{–}	⇌	Sm(s)	−2.68	2	
Be	Be_{2}O_{3}^{2−} + 3 H_{2}O + 4 e^{–}	⇌	2 Be(s) + 6 OH^{−}	−2.63	4	
Pm	Pm^{3+} + e^{–}	⇌	Pm^{2+}	−2.6	1	
Dy	Dy^{3+} + e^{–}	⇌	Dy^{2+}	−2.6	1	
No	No^{2+} + 2 e^{–}	⇌	No(s)	−2.5	2	
Hf	HfO(OH)_{2} + H_{2}O + 4 e^{–}	⇌	Hf(s) + 4 OH^{−}	−2.5	4	
Th	Th(OH)_{4} + 4 e^{–}	⇌	Th(s) + 4 OH^{−}	−2.48	4	
Md	Md^{2+} + 2 e^{–}	⇌	Md(s)	−2.4	2	
Tm	Tm^{2+} + 2 e^{–}	⇌	Tm(s)	−2.4	2	
La	La^{3+} + 3 e^{–}	⇌	La(s)	−2.379	3	
Y	Y^{3+} + 3 e^{–}	⇌	Y(s)	−2.372	3	
Mg	Mg^{2+} + 2 e^{–}	⇌	Mg(s)	−2.372	2	
Sc	ScF_{3}(aq) + 3 H^{+} + 3 e^{–}	⇌	Sc(s) + 3 HF(aq)	−2.37	3	
Zr	ZrO(OH)_{2}(s) + H_{2}O + 4 e^{–}	⇌	Zr(s) + 4 OH^{−}	−2.36	4	
Pr	Pr^{3+} + 3 e^{–}	⇌	Pr(s)	−2.353	3	
Ce	Ce^{3+} + 3 e^{–}	⇌	Ce(s)	−2.336	3	
Er	Er^{3+} + 3 e^{–}	⇌	Er(s)	−2.331	3	
Ho	Ho^{3+} + 3 e^{–}	⇌	Ho(s)	−2.33	3	
Al	H_{2}AlO_{3}^{−} + H_{2}O + 3 e^{–}	⇌	Al(s) + 4 OH^{−}	−2.33	3	
Nd	Nd^{3+} + 3 e^{–}	⇌	Nd(s)	−2.323	3	
Tm	Tm^{3+} + 3 e^{–}	⇌	Tm(s)	−2.319	3	
Al	Al(OH)_{3}(s) + 3 e^{–}	⇌	Al(s) + 3 OH^{−}	−2.31	3	
Sm	Sm^{3+} + 3 e^{–}	⇌	Sm(s)	−2.304	3	
Fm	Fm^{2+} + 2 e^{–}	⇌	Fm(s)	−2.3	2	
Am	Am^{3+} + e^{–}	⇌	Am^{2+}	−2.3	1	
Dy	Dy^{3+} + 3 e^{–}	⇌	Dy(s)	−2.295	3	
Lu	Lu^{3+} + 3 e^{–}	⇌	Lu(s)	−2.28	3	
Sc	ScF_{2}^{+} + 2 H^{+} + 3 e^{–}	⇌	Sc(s) + 2 HF(l)	−2.28	3	
Tb	Tb^{3+} + 3 e^{–}	⇌	Tb(s)	−2.28	3	
Gd	Gd^{3+} + 3 e^{–}	⇌	Gd(s)	−2.279	3	
**H**	**H_{2}(g) + 2 e^{–}**	⇌	**2 H^{−}**	**−2.23**	**2**	
Es	Es^{2+} + 2 e^{–}	⇌	Es(s)	−2.23	2	
Pm	Pm^{2+} + 2 e^{–}	⇌	Pm(s)	−2.2	2	
Tm	Tm^{3+} + e^{–}	⇌	Tm^{2+}	−2.2	1	
Dy	Dy^{2+} + 2 e^{–}	⇌	Dy(s)	−2.2	2	
Ac	Ac^{3+} + 3 e^{–}	⇌	Ac(s)	−2.2	3	
Yb	Yb^{3+} + 3 e^{–}	⇌	Yb(s)	−2.19	3	
Cf	Cf^{2+} + 2 e^{–}	⇌	Cf(s)	−2.12	2	
Nd	Nd^{2+} + 2 e^{–}	⇌	Nd(s)	−2.1	2	
Ho	Ho^{2+} + 2 e^{–}	⇌	Ho(s)	−2.1	2	
Sc	Sc^{3+} + 3 e^{–}	⇌	Sc(s)	−2.077	3	
Al	AlF_{6}^{3−} + 3 e^{–}	⇌	Al(s) + 6 F^{−}	−2.069	3	
Cm	Cm^{3+} + 3 e^{–}	⇌	Cm(s)	−2.04	3	
Pu	Pu^{3+} + 3 e^{–}	⇌	Pu(s)	−2.031	3	
Pr	Pr^{2+} + 2 e^{–}	⇌	Pr(s)	−2	2	
Er	Er^{2+} + 2 e^{–}	⇌	Er(s)	−2	2	
Eu	Eu^{3+} + 3 e^{–}	⇌	Eu(s)	−1.991	3	
Lr	Lr^{3+} + 3 e^{–}	⇌	Lr(s)	−1.96	3	
Cf	Cf^{3+} + 3 e^{–}	⇌	Cf(s)	−1.94	3	
Es	Es^{3+} + 3 e^{–}	⇌	Es(s)	−1.91	3	
Pa	Pa^{4+} + e^{–}	⇌	Pa^{3+}	−1.9	1	
Am	Am^{2+} + 2 e^{–}	⇌	Am(s)	−1.9	2	
Th	Th^{4+} + 4 e^{–}	⇌	Th(s)	−1.899	4	
Fm	Fm^{3+} + 3 e^{–}	⇌	Fm(s)	−1.89	3	
N	N_{2}(g) + 2 H_{2}O + 4 H^{+} + 2 e^{–}	⇌	2 NH_{3}OH^{+}	−1.87	2	
Np	Np^{3+} + 3 e^{–}	⇌	Np(s)	−1.856	3	
Be	Be^{2+} + 2 e^{–}	⇌	Be(s)	−1.847	2	
P	H_{2}PO_{2}^{−} + e^{–}	⇌	P(s) + 2 OH^{−}	−1.82	1	
U	U^{3+} + 3 e^{–}	⇌	U(s)	−1.798	3	
Sr	Sr^{2+} + 2 e^{–}	⇌	Sr(Hg)	−1.793	2	
B	H_{2}BO_{3}^{−} + H_{2}O + 3 e^{–}	⇌	B(s) + 4 OH^{−}	−1.79	3	
Th	ThO_{2} + 4 H^{+} + 4 e^{–}	⇌	Th(s) + 2 H_{2}O	−1.789	4	
Hf	HfO^{2+} + 2 H^{+} + 4 e^{–}	⇌	Hf(s) + H_{2}O	−1.724	4	
P	HPO_{3}^{2−} + 2 H_{2}O + 3 e^{–}	⇌	P(s) + 5 OH^{−}	−1.71	3	
Si	SiO_{3}^{2−} + 3 H_{2}O + 4 e^{–}	⇌	Si(s) + 6 OH^{−}	−1.697	4	
Al	Al^{3+} + 3 e^{–}	⇌	Al(s)	−1.662	3	
Ti	Ti^{2+} + 2 e^{–}	⇌	Ti(s)	−1.63	2	
Zr	ZrO_{2}(s) + 4 H^{+} + 4 e^{–}	⇌	Zr(s) + 2 H_{2}O	−1.553	4	
Zr	Zr^{4+} + 4 e^{–}	⇌	Zr(s)	−1.45	4	
Ti	Ti^{3+} + 3 e^{–}	⇌	Ti(s)	−1.37	3	
Ti	TiO(s) + 2 H^{+} + 2 e^{–}	⇌	Ti(s) + H_{2}O	−1.31	2	
B	[B(OH)_{4}]^{−} + 4 H_{2}O + 8 e^{–}	⇌	BH_{4}^{−} + 8 OH^{−}	−1.24	8	
Ti	Ti_{2}O_{3}(s) + 2 H^{+} + 2 e^{–}	⇌	2 TiO(s) + H_{2}O	−1.23	2	
Ga	[Ga(OH)_{4}]^{−} + 3 e^{–}	⇌	Ga(s) + 3 OH^{−}	−1.22	3	
Zn	[Zn(OH)_{4}]^{2−} + 2 e^{–}	⇌	Zn(s) + 4 OH^{−}	−1.199	2	
Mn	Mn^{2+} + 2 e^{–}	⇌	Mn(s)	−1.185	2	
Fe	[Fe(CN)_{6}]^{4−} + 6 H^{+} + 2 e^{–}	⇌	Fe(s) + 6 HCN(aq)	−1.16	2	
C	C(s) + 3 H_{2}O + 2 e^{–}	⇌	CH_{3}OH(l) + 2 OH^{−}	−1.148	2	
Cr	[Cr(CN)_{6}]^{3−} + e^{–}	⇌	[Cr(CN)_{6}]^{4−}	−1.143	1	
Te	Te(s) + 2 e^{–}	⇌	Te^{2−}	−1.143	2	
V	V^{2+} + 2 e^{–}	⇌	V(s)	−1.13	2	
Nb	Nb^{3+} + 3 e^{–}	⇌	Nb(s)	−1.099	3	
Sn	Sn(s) + 4 H^{+} + 4 e^{–}	⇌	SnH_{4}(g)	−1.07	4	
Po	Po(s) + 2 e^{–}	⇌	Po^{2−}	−1.021	2	
Cr	[Cr(edta)(H_{2}O)]^{−} + e^{–}	⇌	[Cr(edta)(H_{2}O)]^{2−}	−0.99	1	
P	2 H_{3}PO_{4}(aq) + 2 H^{+} + 2 e^{–}	⇌	(H_{2}PO_{3})_{2}(aq) + H_{2}O	−0.933	2	
C	CO_{3}^{2−} + 3 H^{+} + 2 e^{–}	⇌	HCO_{2}^{−} + H_{2}O	−0.93	2	
Ti	TiO^{2+} + 2 H^{+} + 4 e^{–}	⇌	Ti(s) + H_{2}O	−0.93	4	
Si	SiO_{2}(quartz) + 4 H^{+} + 4 e^{–}	⇌	Si(s) + 2 H_{2}O	−0.909	4	
Cr	Cr^{2+} + 2 e^{–}	⇌	Cr(s)	−0.9	2	
B	B(OH)_{3}(aq) + 3 H^{+} + 3 e^{–}	⇌	B(s) + 3 H_{2}O	−0.89	3	
Fe	Fe(OH)_{2}(s) + 2 e^{–}	⇌	Fe(s) + 2 OH^{−}	−0.89	2	
Fe	Fe_{2}O_{3}(s) + 3 H_{2}O + 2 e^{–}	⇌	2 Fe(OH)_{2}(s) + 2 OH^{−}	−0.86	2	
**H**	**2 H_{2}O + 2 e^{–}**	⇌	**H_{2}(g) + 2 OH^{−}**	**−0.8277**	**2**	
Bi	Bi(s) + 3 H^{+} + 3 e^{–}	⇌	BiH_{3}	−0.8	3	
Zn	Zn^{2+} + 2 e^{–}	⇌	Zn(Hg)	−0.7628	2	
Zn	Zn^{2+} + 2 e^{–}	⇌	Zn(s)	−0.7618	2	
Ta	Ta_{2}O_{5}(s) + 10 H^{+} + 10 e^{–}	⇌	2 Ta(s) + 5 H_{2}O	−0.75	10	
Cr	Cr^{3+} + 3 e^{–}	⇌	Cr(s)	−0.74	3	
Te	2 Te(s) + 2 e^{–}	⇌	Te_{2}^{2−}	−0.74	2	
Ni	Ni(OH)_{2}(s) + 2 e^{–}	⇌	Ni(s) + 2 OH^{−}	−0.72	2	
Nb	Nb_{2}O_{5}(s) + 10 H^{+} + 10 e^{–}	⇌	2 Nb(s) + 5 H_{2}O	−0.7	10	
Ag	Ag_{2}S(s) + 2 e^{–}	⇌	2 Ag(s) + S^{2−}	−0.69	2	
Te	Te_{2}^{2−} + 4 H^{+} + 2 e^{–}	⇌	2 H_{2}Te(g)	−0.64	2	
Sb	[Sb(OH)_{4}]^{−} + 3 e^{–}	⇌	Sb(s) + 4 OH^{−}	−0.639	3	
Au	[Au(CN)_{2}]^{−} + e^{–}	⇌	Au(s) + 2 CN^{−}	−0.6	1	
Ta	Ta^{3+} + 3 e^{–}	⇌	Ta(s)	−0.6	3	
Pb	PbO(s) + H_{2}O + 2 e^{–}	⇌	Pb(s) + 2 OH^{−}	−0.580	2	
Ti	2 TiO_{2}(s) + 2 H^{+} + 2 e^{–}	⇌	Ti_{2}O_{3}(s) + H_{2}O	−0.56	2	
Ga	Ga^{3+} + 3 e^{–}	⇌	Ga(s)	−0.549	3	
U	U^{4+} + e^{–}	⇌	U^{3+}	−0.52	1	
P	H_{3}PO_{2}(aq) + H^{+} + e^{–}	⇌	P(white) (Note: Not specified in the indicated reference, but assumed due to the difference between the value −0.454 and that computed by (2×(−0.499) + (−0.508))/3 = −0.502, exactly matching the difference between the values for white (−0.063) and red (−0.111) phosphorus in equilibrium with PH_{3}.) + 2 H_{2}O	−0.508	1	
P	H_{3}PO_{3}(aq) + 2 H^{+} + 2 e^{–}	⇌	H_{3}PO_{2}(aq) + H_{2}O	−0.499	2	
Ni	NiO_{2}(s) + 2 H_{2}O + 2 e^{–}	⇌	Ni(OH)_{2}(s) + 2 OH^{−}	−0.49	2	
Sb	[Sb(OH)_{6}]^{−} + 2 e^{–}	⇌	[Sb(OH)_{4}]^{−} + 2 OH^{−}	−0.465	2	
P	H_{3}PO_{3}(aq) + 3 H^{+} + 3 e^{–}	⇌	P(red) + 3 H_{2}O	−0.454	3	
Bi	Bi_{2}O_{3}(s) + 3 H_{2}O + 6 e^{–}	⇌	Bi(s) + 6 OH^{−}	−0.452	6	
Ta	TaF_{7}^{2−} + 7 H^{+} + 5 e^{–}	⇌	Ta(s) + 7 HF(l)	−0.45	5	
In	In^{3+} + 2 e^{–}	⇌	In^{+}	−0.444	2	
Cu	[Cu(CN)_{2}]^{−} + e^{–}	⇌	Cu(s) + 2 CN^{−}	−0.44	1	
Fe	Fe^{2+} + 2 e^{–}	⇌	Fe(s)	−0.44	2	
C	2 CO_{2}(g) + 2 H^{+} + 2 e^{–}	⇌	HOOCCOOH(aq)	−0.43	2	
Cr	Cr^{3+} + e^{–}	⇌	Cr^{2+}	−0.407	1	
Cd	Cd^{2+} + 2 e^{–}	⇌	Cd(s)	−0.4	2	
Ti	Ti^{3+} + e^{–}	⇌	Ti^{2+}	−0.37	1	
Cu	Cu_{2}O(s) + H_{2}O + 2 e^{–}	⇌	2 Cu(s) + 2 OH^{−}	−0.36	2	
Pb	PbSO_{4}(s) + 2 e^{–}	⇌	Pb(s) + SO_{4}^{2−}	−0.3588	2	
Pb	PbSO_{4}(s) + 2 e^{–}	⇌	Pb(Hg) + SO_{4}^{2−}	−0.3505	2	
Eu	Eu^{3+} + e^{–}	⇌	Eu^{2+}	−0.35	1	
In	In^{3+} + 3 e^{–}	⇌	In(s)	−0.34	3	
Tl	Tl^{+} + e^{–}	⇌	Tl(s)	−0.34	1	
Ge	Ge(s) + 4 H^{+} + 4 e^{–}	⇌	GeH_{4}(g)	−0.29	4	
Co	Co^{2+} + 2 e^{–}	⇌	Co(s)	−0.28	2	
P	H_{3}PO_{4}(aq) + 2 H^{+} + 2 e^{–}	⇌	H_{3}PO_{3}(aq) + H_{2}O	−0.276	2	
N	N_{2}(g) + 8 H^{+} + 6 e^{–}	⇌	2 NH_{4}^{+}	0.27	6	
V	V^{3+} + e^{–}	⇌	V^{2+}	−0.26	1	
Ni	Ni^{2+} + 2 e^{–}	⇌	Ni(s)	−0.257	2	
S	2 HSO_{4}^{−} + 2 H^{+} + 2 e^{–}	⇌	S_{2}O_{6}^{2−} + 2 H_{2}O	−0.253	2	
As	As(s) + 3 H^{+} + 3 e^{–}	⇌	AsH_{3}(g)	−0.23	3	
N	N_{2}(g) + 5 H^{+} + 4 e^{–}	⇌	N_{2}H_{5}^{+}	−0.23	4	
Ga	Ga^{+} + e^{–}	⇌	Ga(s)	−0.2	1	
Ag	AgI(s) + e^{–}	⇌	Ag(s) + I^{−}	−0.15224	1	
Ge	GeO_{2}(s) + 4 H^{+} + 4 e^{–}	⇌	Ge(s) + 2 H_{2}O	−0.15	4	
Mo	MoO_{2}(s) + 4 H^{+} + 4 e^{–}	⇌	Mo(s) + 2 H_{2}O	−0.15	4	
Si	Si(s) + 4 H^{+} + 4 e^{–}	⇌	SiH_{4}(g)	−0.14	4	
Sn	Sn^{2+} + 2 e^{−}	⇌	Sn(s)	−0.13	2	
O	O_{2}(g) + H^{+} + e^{−}	⇌	HO^{•}_{2}(aq)	−0.13	1	
In	In^{+} + e^{−}	⇌	In(s)	−0.126	1	
Pb	Pb^{2+} + 2 e^{–}	⇌	Pb(s)	−0.126	2	
W	WO_{2}(s) + 4 H^{+} + 4 e^{–}	⇌	W(s) + 2 H_{2}O	−0.12	4	
Ge	GeO_{2}(s) + 2 H^{+} + 2 e^{–}	⇌	GeO(s) + H_{2}O	−0.118	2	
P	P(red) + 3 H^{+} + 3 e^{–}	⇌	PH_{3}(g)	−0.111	3	
C	CO_{2}(g) + 2 H^{+} + 2 e^{–}	⇌	HCOOH(aq)	−0.11	2	
Se	Se(s) + 2 H^{+} + 2 e^{–}	⇌	H_{2}Se(g)	−0.11	2	
C	CO_{2}(g) + 2 H^{+} + 2 e^{–}	⇌	CO(g) + H_{2}O	−0.11	2	
Sn	α-SnO(s) + 2 H^{+} + 2 e^{–}	⇌	Sn(s) + H_{2}O	−0.104	2	
Cu	[Cu(NH_{3})_{2}]^{+} + e^{–}	⇌	Cu(s) + 2 NH_{3}(aq)	−0.1	1	
Nb	Nb_{2}O_{5}(s) + 10 H^{+} + 4 e^{–}	⇌	2 Nb^{3+} + 5 H_{2}O	−0.1	4	
W	WO_{3}(aq) + 6 H^{+} + 6 e^{–}	⇌	W(s) + 3 H_{2}O	−0.09	6	
Sn	SnO_{2}(s) + 2 H^{+} + 2 e^{–}	⇌	α-SnO(s) + H_{2}O	−0.088	2	
Fe	Fe_{3}O_{4}(s) + 8 H^{+} + 8 e^{–}	⇌	3 Fe(s) + 4 H_{2}O	−0.085	8	
V	VOH^{2+} + H^{+} + e^{–}	⇌	V^{2+} + H_{2}O	−0.082	1	
P	P(white) + 3 H^{+} + 3 e^{–}	⇌	PH_{3}(g)	−0.063	3	
N	N_{2}O(g) + H_{2}O + 6 H^{+} + 4 e^{–}	⇌	2 NH_{3}OH^{+}	−0.05	4	
Fe	Fe^{3+} + 3 e^{–}	⇌	Fe(s)	−0.04	3	
C	HCOOH(aq) + 2 H^{+} + 2 e^{–}	⇌	HCHO(aq) + H_{2}O	−0.034	2	
**H**	**2 H^{+} + 2 e^{–}**	⇌	**H_{2}(g)**	**0**	**2**	
Ag	AgBr(s) + e^{–}	⇌	Ag(s) + Br^{−}	0.07133	1	
S	S_{4}O_{6}^{2−} + 2 e^{–}	⇌	2 S_{2}O_{3}^{2−}	0.08	2	
N	N_{2}(g) + 2 H_{2}O + 6 H^{+} + 6 e^{–}	⇌	2 NH_{4}OH(aq)	0.092	6	
Hg	HgO(s) + H_{2}O + 2 e^{–}	⇌	Hg(l) + 2 OH^{−}	0.0977	2	
Cu	[Cu(NH_{3})_{4}]^{2+} + e^{–}	⇌	[Cu(NH_{3})_{2}]^{+} + 2 NH_{3}(aq)	0.1	1	
Ru	[Ru(NH_{3})_{6}]^{3+} + e^{–}	⇌	[Ru(NH_{3})_{6}]^{2+}	0.1	1	
N	N_{2}H_{4}(aq) + 4 H_{2}O + 2 e^{–}	⇌	2 NH_{4}^{+} + 4 OH^{−}	0.11	2	
Mo	H_{2}MoO_{4}(aq) + 6 H^{+} + 6 e^{–}	⇌	Mo(s) + 4 H_{2}O	0.11	6	
Ge	Ge^{4+} + 4 e^{–}	⇌	Ge(s)	0.12	4	
C	C(s) + 4 H^{+} + 4 e^{–}	⇌	CH_{4}(g)	0.13	4	
C	HCHO(aq) + 2 H^{+} + 2 e^{–}	⇌	CH_{3}OH(aq)	0.13	2	
S	S(s) + 2 H^{+} + 2 e^{–}	⇌	H_{2}S(g)	0.144	2	
Sb	Sb_{2}O_{3}(s) + 6 H^{+} + 6 e^{–}	⇌	2 Sb(s) + 3 H_{2}O	0.15	6	
Sn	Sn^{4+} + 2 e^{–}	⇌	Sn^{2+}	0.151	2	
S	HSO_{4}^{−} + 3 H^{+} + 2 e^{–}	⇌	SO_{2}(aq) + 2 H_{2}O	0.158	2	
Cu	Cu^{2+} + e^{–}	⇌	Cu^{+}	0.159	1	
U	UO_{2}^{2+} + e^{–}	⇌	UO_{2}^{+}	0.163	1	
S	SO_{4}^{2−} + 4 H^{+} + 2 e^{–}	⇌	SO_{2}(aq) + 2 H_{2}O	0.17	2	
Ti	TiO^{2+} + 2 H^{+} + e^{–}	⇌	Ti^{3+} + H_{2}O	0.19	1	
Sb	SbO^{+} + 2 H^{+} + 3 e^{–}	⇌	Sb(s) + H_{2}O	0.2	3	
Fe	3 Fe_{2}O_{3}(s) + 2 H^{+} + 2 e^{–}	⇌	2 Fe_{3}O_{4}(s) + H_{2}O	0.22	2	
Ag	AgCl(s) + e^{–}	⇌	Ag(s) + Cl^{−}	0.22233	1	
As	H_{3}AsO_{3}(aq) + 3 H^{+} + 3 e^{–}	⇌	As(s) + 3 H_{2}O	0.24	3	
Ru	Ru^{3+} + e^{–}	⇌	Ru^{2+}	0.249	1	
Pb	PbO_{2}(s) + H_{2}O + 2 e^{–}	⇌	α-PbO(s) + 2 OH^{−}	0.254	2	
Ge	GeO(s) + 2 H^{+} + 2 e^{–}	⇌	Ge(s) + H_{2}O	0.26	2	
Hg	Hg_{2}Cl_{2}(s) + 2 e^{–}	⇌	2 Hg(l) + 2 Cl^{−}	0.27	2	
U	UO_{2}^{+} + 4 H^{+} + e^{–}	⇌	U^{4+} + 2 H_{2}O	0.273	1	
At	At + e^{–}	⇌	At^{−}	0.3	1	
Bi	Bi^{3+} + 3 e^{–}	⇌	Bi(s)	0.308	3	
C	2 HCNO + 2 H^{+} + 2 e^{–}	⇌	(CN)_{2} + 2 H_{2}O	0.330	2	
Cu	Cu^{2+} + 2 e^{–}	⇌	Cu(s)	0.337	2	
V	VO^{2+} + 2 H^{+} + e^{–}	⇌	V^{3+} + H_{2}O	0.337	1	
Sb	Sb_{2}O_{4}(s) + 2 H^{+} + 2 e^{–}	⇌	Sb_{2}O_{3}(s) + H_{2}O	0.342	2	
At	At^{+} + 2 e^{–}	⇌	At^{−}	0.36	2	
Fe	[Fe(CN)_{6}]^{3−} + e^{–}	⇌	[Fe(CN)_{6}]^{4−}	0.3704	1	
C	(CN)_{2} + 2 H^{+} + 2 e^{–}	⇌	2 HCN	0.373	2	
P	(H_{2}PO_{3})_{2}(aq) + 2 H^{+} + 2 e^{–}	⇌	2 H_{3}PO_{3}	0.38	2	
S	2 SO_{2}(aq) + 2 H^{+} + 2 e^{–}	⇌	S_{2}O_{3}^{2−} + H_{2}O	0.4	2	
**O**	**O_{2}(g) + 2 H_{2}O + 4 e^{–}**	⇌	**4 OH^{−}**	**0.401**	**4**	
Mo	H_{2}MoO_{4} + 6 H^{+} + 3 e^{–}	⇌	Mo^{3+} + 4 H_{2}O	0.43	3	
Ru	Ru^{2+} + 2 e^{–}	⇌	Ru(s)	0.455	2	
V	VO(OH)^{+} + 2 H^{+} + e^{–}	⇌	VOH^{2+} + H_{2}O	0.481	1	
Re	Re^{3+} + 3 e^{–}	⇌	Re(s)	0.5	3	
C	CH_{3}OH(aq) + 2 H^{+} + 2 e^{–}	⇌	CH_{4}(g) + H_{2}O	0.5	2	
S	SO_{2}(aq) + 4 H^{+} + 4 e^{–}	⇌	S(s) + 2 H_{2}O	0.5	4	
S	4 SO_{2}(aq) + 4 H^{+} + 6 e^{–}	⇌	S_{4}O_{6}^{2−} + 2 H_{2}O	0.51	6	
Cu	Cu^{+} + e^{–}	⇌	Cu(s)	0.52	1	
C	CO(g) + 2 H^{+} + 2 e^{–}	⇌	C(s) + H_{2}O	0.52	2	
I	I_{3}^{−} + 2 e^{–}	⇌	3 I^{−}	0.53	2	
Te	TeO_{2}(s) + 4 H^{+} + 4 e^{–}	⇌	Te(s) + 2 H_{2}O	0.53	4	
Cu	Cu^{2+} + Cl^{−} + e^{–}	⇌	CuCl(s)	0.54	1	
I	I_{2}(s) + 2 e^{–}	⇌	2 I^{−}	0.54	2	
Au	AuI_{4}^{−} + 3 e^{–}	⇌	Au(s) + 4 I^{−}	0.56	3	
As	H_{3}AsO_{4}(aq) + 2 H^{+} + 2 e^{–}	⇌	H_{3}AsO_{3}(aq) + H_{2}O	0.56	2	
S	S_{2}O_{6}^{2−} + 4 H^{+} + 2 e^{–}	⇌	2 H_{2}SO_{3}	0.569	2	
Au	AuI_{2}^{−} + e^{–}	⇌	Au(s) + 2 I^{−}	0.58	1	
Mn	MnO_{4}^{−} + 2 H_{2}O + 3 e^{–}	⇌	MnO_{2}(s) + 4 OH^{−}	0.595	3	
S	S_{2}O_{3}^{2−} + 6 H^{+} + 4 e^{–}	⇌	2 S(s) + 3 H_{2}O	0.6	4	
Fe	Fc^{+} + e^{–}	⇌	Fc(s)	0.63	1	Substantial literature variation
Mo	H_{2}MoO_{4}(aq) + 2 H^{+} + 2 e^{–}	⇌	MoO_{2}(s) + 2 H_{2}O	0.65	2	
N	HN_{3}(aq) + 11 H^{+} + 8 e^{–}	⇌	3 NH_{4}^{+}	0.69	8	
O	O_{2}(g) + 2 H^{+} + 2 e^{–}	⇌	H_{2}O_{2}(aq)	0.695	2	
Sb	Sb_{2}O_{5}(s) + 4 H^{+} + 4 e^{–}	⇌	Sb_{2}O_{3}(s) + 2 H_{2}O	0.699	4	
C	+ 2 H^{+} + 2 e^{–}	⇌		0.6992	2	
V	H_{2}V_{10}O_{28}^{4−} + 24 H^{+} + 10 e^{–}	⇌	10 VO(OH)^{+} + 8 H_{2}O	0.723	10	
Pt	PtCl_{6}^{2−} + 2 e^{–}	⇌	PtCl_{4}^{2−} + 2 Cl^{−}	0.726	2	
Fe	Fe_{2}O_{3}(s) + 6 H^{+} + 2 e^{–}	⇌	2 Fe^{2+} + 3 H_{2}O	0.728	2	
Se	H_{2}SeO_{3}(aq) + 4 H^{+} + 4 e^{–}	⇌	Se(s) + 3 H_{2}O	0.74	4	
At	AtO^{+} + 2 H^{+} + 2 e^{–}	⇌	At^{+} + H_{2}O	0.74	2	
Tl	Tl^{3+} + 3 e^{–}	⇌	Tl(s)	0.741	3	
No	No^{3+} + e^{–}	⇌	No^{2+}	0.75	1	
Pt	PtCl_{4}^{2−} + 2 e^{–}	⇌	Pt(s) + 4 Cl^{−}	0.758	2	
Br	BrO^{−} + H_{2}O + 2 e^{–}	⇌	Br^{−} + 2 OH^{−}	0.76	2	
Po	Po^{4+} + 4 e^{–}	⇌	Po(s)	0.76	4	
S	(SCN)_{2} + 2 e^{–}	⇌	2 SCN^{−}	0.769	2	
Fe	Fe^{3+} + e^{–}	⇌	Fe^{2+}	0.771	1	
Hg	Hg_{2}^{2+} + 2 e^{–}	⇌	2 Hg(l)	0.7973	2	
Ag	Ag^{+} + e^{–}	⇌	Ag(s)	0.7996	1	
N	2 NO_{3}^{−} + 4 H^{+} + 2 e^{–}	⇌	N_{2}O_{4}(g) + 2 H_{2}O	0.803	2	
Fe	2 FeO_{4}^{2−} + 5 H_{2}O + 6 e^{–}	⇌	Fe_{2}O_{3}(s) + 10 OH^{−}	0.81	6	
Au	AuBr_{4}^{−} + 3 e^{–}	⇌	Au(s) + 4 Br^{−}	0.85	3	
Hg	Hg^{2+} + 2 e^{–}	⇌	Hg(l)	0.85	2	
Ir	IrCl_{6}^{2−} + e^{–}	⇌	IrCl_{6}^{3−}	0.87	1	
Mn	MnO_{4}^{−} + H^{+} + e^{–}	⇌	HMnO_{4}^{−}	0.9	1	
Po	Po^{4+} + 2 e^{–}	⇌	Po^{2+}	0.9	2	
Hg	2 Hg^{2+} + 2 e^{–}	⇌	Hg_{2}^{2+}	0.91	2	
Pd	Pd^{2+} + 2 e^{–}	⇌	Pd(s)	0.915	2	
Au	AuCl_{4}^{−} + 3 e^{–}	⇌	Au(s) + 4 Cl^{−}	0.93	3	
N	NO_{3}^{−} + 3 H^{+} + 2 e^{–}	⇌	HNO_{2}(aq)	0.94	2	
Mn	MnO_{2}(s) + 4 H^{+} + e^{–}	⇌	Mn^{3+} + 2 H_{2}O	0.95	1	
N	NO_{3}^{−} + 4 H^{+} + 3 e^{–}	⇌	NO(g) + 2 H_{2}O	0.958	3	
Au	AuBr_{2}^{−} + e^{–}	⇌	Au(s) + 2 Br^{−}	0.96	1	
Fe	Fe_{3}O_{4}(s) + 8 H^{+} + 2 e^{–}	⇌	3 Fe^{2+} + 4 H_{2}O	0.98	2	
Xe	HXeO_{6}^{3−} + 2 H_{2}O + 2 e^{–}	⇌	HXeO_{4}^{−} + 4 OH^{−}	0.99	2	
N	HNO_{2}(aq) + H^{+} + e^{–}	⇌	NO(g) + H_{2}O	0.996	1	
At	HAtO + H^{+} + e^{–}	⇌	At + H_{2}O	1.0	1	
V	VO_{2}^{+} + 2 H^{+} + e^{–}	⇌	VO^{2+} + H_{2}O	1	1	
Te	H_{6}TeO_{6}(aq) + 2 H^{+} + 2 e^{–}	⇌	TeO_{2}(s) + 4 H_{2}O	1.02	2	
N	NO_{2}(g) + 2 H^{+} + 2 e^{–}	⇌	NO(g) + H_{2}O	1.03	2	
Br	Br_{3}^{−} + 2 e^{–}	⇌	3 Br^{−}	1.05	2	
Sb	Sb_{2}O_{5}(s) + 2 H^{+} + 2 e^{–}	⇌	Sb_{2}O_{4}(s) + H_{2}O	1.055	2	
I	ICl_{2}^{−} + e^{–}	⇌	2 Cl^{−} + I(s)	1.06	1	
Br	Br_{2}(l) + 2 e^{–}	⇌	2 Br^{−}	1.066	2	
N	N_{2}O_{4}(g) + 2 H^{+} + 2 e^{–}	⇌	2 HNO_{2}	1.07	2	
Br	Br_{2}(aq) + 2 e^{–}	⇌	2 Br^{−}	1.0873	2	
Ru	RuO_{2} + 4 H^{+} + 2 e^{–}	⇌	Ru^{2+} + 2 H_{2}O	1.120	2	
Cu	Cu^{2+} + 2 CN^{−} + e^{–}	⇌	Cu(CN)_{2}^{−}	1.12	1	
I	IO_{3}^{−} + 5 H^{+} + 4 e^{–}	⇌	HIO(aq) + 2 H_{2}O	1.13	4	
O	H_{2}O_{2}(aq) + H^{+} + e^{–}	⇌	H_{2}O + HO•	1.14	1	
Au	AuCl_{2}^{−} + e^{–}	⇌	Au(s) + 2 Cl^{−}	1.15	1	
Se	HSeO_{4}^{−} + 3 H^{+} + 2 e^{–}	⇌	H_{2}SeO_{3}(aq) + H_{2}O	1.15	2	
Ag	Ag_{2}O(s) + 2 H^{+} + 2 e^{–}	⇌	2 Ag(s) + H_{2}O	1.17	2	
Cl	ClO_{3}^{−} + 2 H^{+} + e^{–}	⇌	ClO_{2}(g) + H_{2}O	1.175	1	
Xe	HXeO_{6}^{3−} + 5 H_{2}O + 8 e^{–}	⇌	Xe(g) + 11 OH^{−}	1.18	8	
Pt	Pt^{2+} + 2 e^{–}	⇌	Pt(s)	1.188	2	
Cl	ClO_{2}(g) + H^{+} + e^{–}	⇌	HClO_{2}(aq)	1.19	1	
I	2 IO_{3}^{−} + 12 H^{+} + 10 e^{–}	⇌	I_{2}(s) + 6 H_{2}O	1.2	10	
Mn	MnO_{2}(s) + 4 H^{+} + 2 e^{–}	⇌	Mn^{2+} + 2 H_{2}O	1.224	2	
**O**	**O_{2}(g) + 4 H^{+} + 4 e^{–}**	⇌	**2 H_{2}O**	**1.229**	**4**	
N	N_{2}H_{5}^{+} + 3 H^{+} + 2 e^{–}	⇌	2 NH_{4}^{+}	1.28	2	
Cl	ClO_{4}^{−} + 2 H^{+} + 2 e^{–}	⇌	ClO_{3}^{−} + H_{2}O	1.23	2	
Ru	[Ru(bipy)_{3}]^{3+} + e^{–}	⇌	[Ru(bipy)_{3}]^{2+}	1.24	1	
Xe	HXeO_{4}^{−} + 3 H_{2}O + 6 e^{–}	⇌	Xe(g) + 7 OH^{−}	1.24	6	
N	2 NO_{3}^{−} + 12 H^{+} + 10 e^{–}	⇌	N_{2}(g) + 6 H_{2}O	1.25	10	
Tl	Tl^{3+} + 2 e^{–}	⇌	Tl^{+}	1.25	2	
N	2 HNO_{2}(aq) + 4 H^{+} + 4 e^{–}	⇌	N_{2}O(g) + 3 H_{2}O	1.297	4	
Cr	Cr_{2}O_{7}^{2−} + 14 H^{+} + 6 e^{–}	⇌	2 Cr^{3+} + 7 H_{2}O	1.33	6	
N	NH_{3}OH^{+} + 2 H^{+} + 2 e^{–}	⇌	NH_{4}^{+} + H_{2}O	1.35	2	
Cl	Cl_{2}(g) + 2 e^{–}	⇌	2 Cl^{−}	1.36	2	
Ru	RuO_{4}^{−} + 8 H^{+} + 5 e^{–}	⇌	Ru^{2+} + 4 H_{2}O	1.368	5	
Ru	RuO_{4} + 4 H^{+} + 4 e^{–}	⇌	RuO_{2} + 2 H_{2}O	1.387	4	
Co	CoO_{2}(s) + 4 H^{+} + e^{–}	⇌	Co^{3+} + 2 H_{2}O	1.42	1	
N	2 NH_{3}OH^{+} + H^{+} + 2 e^{–}	⇌	N_{2}H_{5}^{+} + 2 H_{2}O	1.42	2	
I	2 HIO(aq) + 2 H^{+} + 2 e^{–}	⇌	I_{2}(s) + 2 H_{2}O	1.44	2	
Br	BrO_{3}^{−} + 5 H^{+} + 4 e^{–}	⇌	HBrO(aq) + 2 H_{2}O	1.447	4	
Pb	β^{−}PbO_{2}(s) + 4 H^{+} + 2 e^{–}	⇌	Pb^{2+} + 2 H_{2}O	1.46	2	
Pb	α^{−}PbO_{2}(s) + 4 H^{+} + 2 e^{–}	⇌	Pb^{2+} + 2 H_{2}O	1.468	2	
Br	2 BrO_{3}^{−} + 12 H^{+} + 10 e^{–}	⇌	Br_{2}(l) + 6 H_{2}O	1.48	10	
At	HAtO_{3} + 4 H^{+} + 4 e^{–}	⇌	HAtO + 2 H_{2}O	1.5	4	
Mn	MnO_{4}^{−} + 8 H^{+} + 5 e^{–}	⇌	Mn^{2+} + 4 H_{2}O	1.51	5	
O	HO_{2}• + H^{+} + e^{–}	⇌	H_{2}O_{2}(aq)	1.51	1	
Au	Au^{3+} + 3 e^{–}	⇌	Au(s)	1.52	3	
Ru	RuO_{4}^{2−} + 8 H^{+} + 4 e^{–}	⇌	Ru^{2+} + 4 H_{2}O	1.563	4	
N	2 NO(g) + 2 H^{+} + 2 e^{–}	⇌	N_{2}O(g) + H_{2}O	1.59	2	
Ni	NiO_{2}(s) + 2 H^{+} + 2 e^{–}	⇌	Ni^{2+} + 2 OH^{−}	1.59	2	
Ce	Ce^{4+} + e^{–}	⇌	Ce^{3+}	1.61	1	
Cl	2 HClO(aq) + 2 H^{+} + 2 e^{–}	⇌	Cl_{2}(g) + 2 H_{2}O	1.63	2	
I	IO_{4}^{−} + 2 H^{+} + 2 e^{–}	⇌	IO_{3}^{−} + H_{2}O	1.64	2	
Ag	Ag_{2}O_{3}(s) + 6 H^{+} + 4 e^{–}	⇌	2 Ag^{+} + 3 H_{2}O	1.67	4	
Cl	HClO_{2}(aq) + 2 H^{+} + 2 e^{–}	⇌	HClO(aq) + H_{2}O	1.67	2	
Pb	Pb^{4+} + 2 e^{–}	⇌	Pb^{2+}	1.69	2	
Mn	MnO_{4}^{−} + 4 H^{+} + 3 e^{–}	⇌	MnO_{2}(s) + 2 H_{2}O	1.7	3	
Br	BrO_{4}^{−} + 2 H^{+} + 2 e^{–}	⇌	BrO_{3}^{−} + H_{2}O	1.74	2	
Ag	AgO(s) + 2 H^{+} + e^{–}	⇌	Ag^{+} + H_{2}O	1.77	1	
N	N_{2}O(g) + 2 H^{+} + 2 e^{–}	⇌	N_{2}(g) + H_{2}O	1.77	2	
O	H_{2}O_{2}(aq) + 2 H^{+} + 2 e^{–}	⇌	2 H_{2}O	1.78	2	
Au	Au^{+} + e^{–}	⇌	Au(s)	1.83	1	
Co	Co^{3+} + e^{–}	⇌	Co^{2+}	1.92	1	
Ag	Ag^{2+} + e^{–}	⇌	Ag^{+}	1.98	1	
O	S_{2}O_{8}^{2−} + 2 e^{–}	⇌	2 SO_{4}^{2−}	2.01	2	
O	O_{3}(g) + 2 H^{+} + 2 e^{–}	⇌	O_{2}(g) + H_{2}O	2.075	2	
Mn	HMnO_{4}^{−} + 3 H^{+} + 2 e^{–}	⇌	MnO_{2}(s) + 2 H_{2}O	2.09	2	
Xe	XeO_{3}(aq) + 6 H^{+} + 6 e^{–}	⇌	Xe(g) + 3 H_{2}O	2.12	6	
Xe	H_{4}XeO_{6}(aq) + 8 H^{+} + 8 e^{–}	⇌	Xe(g) + 6 H_{2}O	2.18	8	
Fe	FeO_{4}^{2−} + 8 H^{+} + 3 e^{–}	⇌	Fe^{3+} + 4 H_{2}O	2.2	3	
Xe	XeF_{2}(aq) + 2 H^{+} + 2 e^{–}	⇌	Xe(g) + 2 HF(aq)	2.32	2	
O	HO• + H^{+} + e^{–}	⇌	H_{2}O	2.38	1	
Xe	H_{4}XeO_{6}(aq) + 2 H^{+} + 2 e^{–}	⇌	XeO_{3}(aq) + 3 H_{2}O	2.42	2	
F	F_{2}(g) + 2 e^{–}	⇌	2 F^{−}	2.87	2	
Cm	Cm^{4+} + e^{–}	⇌	Cm^{3+}	3.0	1	Estimated
F	F_{2}(g) + 2 H^{+} + 2 e^{–}	⇌	2 HF(aq)	3.077	2	
Tb	Tb^{4+} + e^{–}	⇌	Tb^{3+}	3.1	1	Estimated
Pr	Pr^{4+} + e^{–}	⇌	Pr^{3+}	3.2	1	Estimated
Kr	KrF_{2}(aq) + 2 e^{–}	⇌	Kr(g) + 2 F^{−}	3.27	2	Estimated

== See also ==
- Galvanic series lists electrode potentials in saltwater
- Standard apparent reduction potentials in biochemistry at pH 7
- Reactivity series#Comparison with standard electrode potentials
