= Half-cell =

Structure in electrochemistry

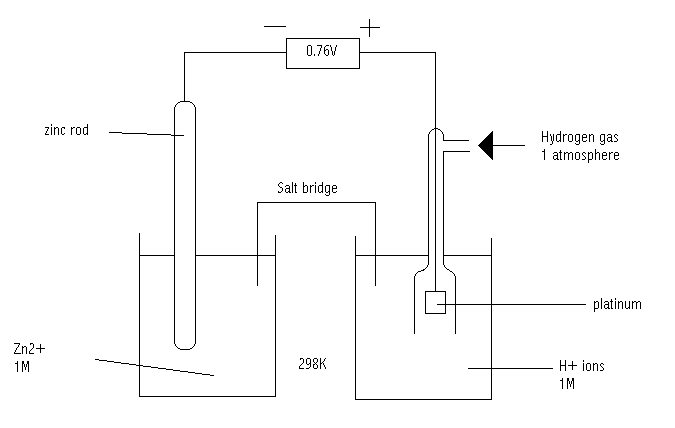
Diagram of the standard hydrogen electrode (SHE); Galvanic cell made of two half-cells, with zinc cathode (left) and platinum anode (right)

In electrochemistry, a half-cell is a structure that contains a conductive electrode and a surrounding conductive electrolyte separated by a naturally occurring Helmholtz double layer. Chemical reactions within this layer momentarily pump electric charges between the electrode and the electrolyte, resulting in a potential difference between the electrode and the electrolyte. The typical anode reaction involves a metal atom in the electrode being dissolved and transported as a positive ion across the double layer, causing the electrolyte to acquire a net positive charge while the electrode acquires a net negative charge. The growing potential difference creates an intense electric field within the double layer, and the potential rises in value until the field halts the net charge-pumping reactions. This self-limiting action occurs almost instantly in an isolated half-cell; in applications two dissimilar half-cells are appropriately connected to constitute a Galvanic cell.

A standard half-cell consists of a metal electrode in an aqueous solution where the concentration of the metal ions is 1 molar (1 mol/L) at 298 kelvins (25 °C). In the case of the standard hydrogen electrode (SHE), a platinum electrode is used and is immersed in an acidic solution where the concentration of hydrogen ions is 1M, with hydrogen gas at 1atm being bubbled through solution. The electrochemical series, which consists of standard electrode potentials and is closely related to the reactivity series, was generated by measuring the difference in potential between the metal half-cell in a circuit with a standard hydrogen half-cell, connected by a salt bridge.

The standard hydrogen half-cell:

2H^{+}(aq) + 2e^{−} → H_{2}(g)

The half-cells of a Daniell cell:

Original equation

Zn + Cu^{2+} → Zn^{2+} + Cu

Half-cell (anode) of Zn

Zn → Zn^{2+} + 2e^{−}

Half-cell (cathode) of Cu

Cu^{2+} + 2e^{−} → Cu

== See also ==
- Standard electrode potential (data page)
