= Electrode potential =

Electromotive force of a cell built of two electrodes

In electrochemistry, electrode potential is the voltage of a galvanic cell built from a standard reference electrode and another electrode to be characterized. The standard electrode potential is a conventional instance of this concept whose reference electrode is the standard hydrogen electrode (SHE), defined to have a potential of zero volts. It may also be defined as the potential difference between the charged metallic rods and salt solution.

The electrode potential has its origin in the potential difference developed at the interface between the electrode and the electrolyte. It is common, for instance, to speak of the electrode potential of the M^{+}/M redox couple.

== Origin and interpretation ==
Electrode potential appears at the interface between an electrode and electrolyte due to the transfer of charged species across the interface, specific adsorption of ions at the interface, and specific adsorption/orientation of polar molecules, including those of the solvent.

In an electrochemical cell, the cathode and the anode have certain electrode potentials independently and the difference between them is the cell potential:

$$E_\text{cell} =  E_\text{cathode} - E_\text{anode}.$$

The electrode potential may be either that at equilibrium at the working electrode ("reversible potential"), or a potential with a non-zero net reaction on the working electrode but zero net current ("corrosion potential", "mixed potential"), or a potential with a non-zero net current on the working electrode (like in galvanic corrosion or voltammetry). Reversible potentials can be sometimes converted to the standard electrode potential for a given electroactive species by extrapolation of the measured values to the standard state.

The value of the electrode potential under non-equilibrium depends on the nature and composition of the contacting phases, and on the kinetics of electrode reactions at the interface (see Butler–Volmer equation).

An operational assumption for determinations of the electrode potentials with the standard hydrogen electrode involves this reference electrode with hydrogen ion in an ideal solution having is "zero potential at all temperatures" equivalently to standard enthalpy of formation of hydrogen ion is also "zero at all temperatures".

== Measurement ==
Three-electrode setup for measurement of electrode potential

The measurement is generally conducted using a three-electrode setup (see the drawing):

1. working electrode,
2. counter electrode,
3. reference electrode (standard hydrogen electrode or an equivalent).

In case of non-zero net current on the electrode, it is essential to minimize the ohmic IR-drop in the electrolyte, e.g., by positioning the reference electrode near the surface of the working electrode (e.g., see Luggin capillary), or by using a supporting electrolyte of sufficiently high conductivity. The potential measurements are performed with the positive terminal of the electrometer connected to the working electrode and the negative terminal to the reference electrode.

== Sign conventions ==
Historically, two conventions for sign for the electrode potential have formed:

1. convention "Nernst–Lewis–Latimer" (sometimes referred to as "American"),
2. convention "Gibbs–Ostwald–Stockholm" (sometimes referred to as "European").

In 1953 in Stockholm IUPAC recognized that either of the conventions is permissible; however, it unanimously recommended that only the magnitude expressed according to the convention (2) be called "the electrode potential". To avoid possible ambiguities, the electrode potential thus defined can also be referred to as Gibbs–Stockholm electrode potential. In both conventions, the standard hydrogen electrode is defined to have a potential of 0 V. Both conventions also agree on the sign of E for a half-cell reaction when it is written as a reduction.

The main difference between the two conventions is that upon reversing the direction of a half-cell reaction as written, according to the convention (1) the sign of E also switches, whereas in the convention (2) it does not. The logic behind switching the sign of E is to maintain the correct sign relationship with the Gibbs free energy change, given by ΔG = −nFE where n is the number of electrons involved and F is the Faraday constant. It is assumed that the half-reaction is balanced by the appropriate SHE half-reaction. Since ΔG switches sign when a reaction is written in reverse, so too, proponents of the convention (1) argue, should the sign of E. Proponents of the convention (2) argue that all reported electrode potentials should be consistent with the electrostatic sign of the relative potential difference.

== Potential difference of a cell assembled of two electrodes ==
Potential of a cell assembled of two electrodes can be determined from the two individual electrode potentials using

$\Delta V_\text{cell} = E_\text{red,cathode} - E_\text{red,anode}$ however , it depends.

or, equivalently,

$$\Delta V_\text{cell} =  E_\text{red,cathode} + E_\text{oxy,anode}.$$

This follows from the IUPAC definition of the electric potential difference of a galvanic cell, according to which the electric potential difference of a cell is the difference of the potentials of the electrodes on the right and the left of the galvanic cell. When ΔV_{cell} is positive, then positive electrical charge flows through the cell from the left electrode (anode) to the right electrode (cathode).

== See also ==
- Absolute electrode potential
- Electric potential
- Galvani potential
- Nernst equation
- Overpotential
- Potential difference (voltage)
- Standard electrode potential
- Table of standard electrode potentials
- Thermodynamic activity
- Volta potential
