= Kerridge (surname) =

Kerridge is a surname. Notable people with the name include:

- Adrian Kerridge (1938–2016), British sound engineer
- Beth Cullen-Kerridge (born 1970), English sculptor
- Edward Kerridge (fl. 1928), British cyclist
- James Kerridge (1830–1911), British architect
- Joe Kerridge (born 1992), American football fullback
- Linda Kerridge (born 1954), Australian actress and model
- Mary Kerridge (1914–1999), English actress and theatre director
- Phyllis Margaret Tookey Kerridge (1901–1940), British chemist and physiologist
- Robert James Kerridge (1901–1979), New Zealand entrepreneur
- Ross Kerridge (born 1956), Australian anaesthetist and politician
- Sam Kerridge (born 1993), Australian rules football player
- Tom Kerridge (born 1973), English Michelin starred chef
- William Henry Kerridge (1881–1940), British musician

== See also ==
- Beth Cullen-Kerridge (born 1970), English sculptor
