= PH meter =

Instrument measuring acidity or alkalinity of solutions

Beckman Model M pH Meter, 1937

Beckman model 72 pH meter, 1960

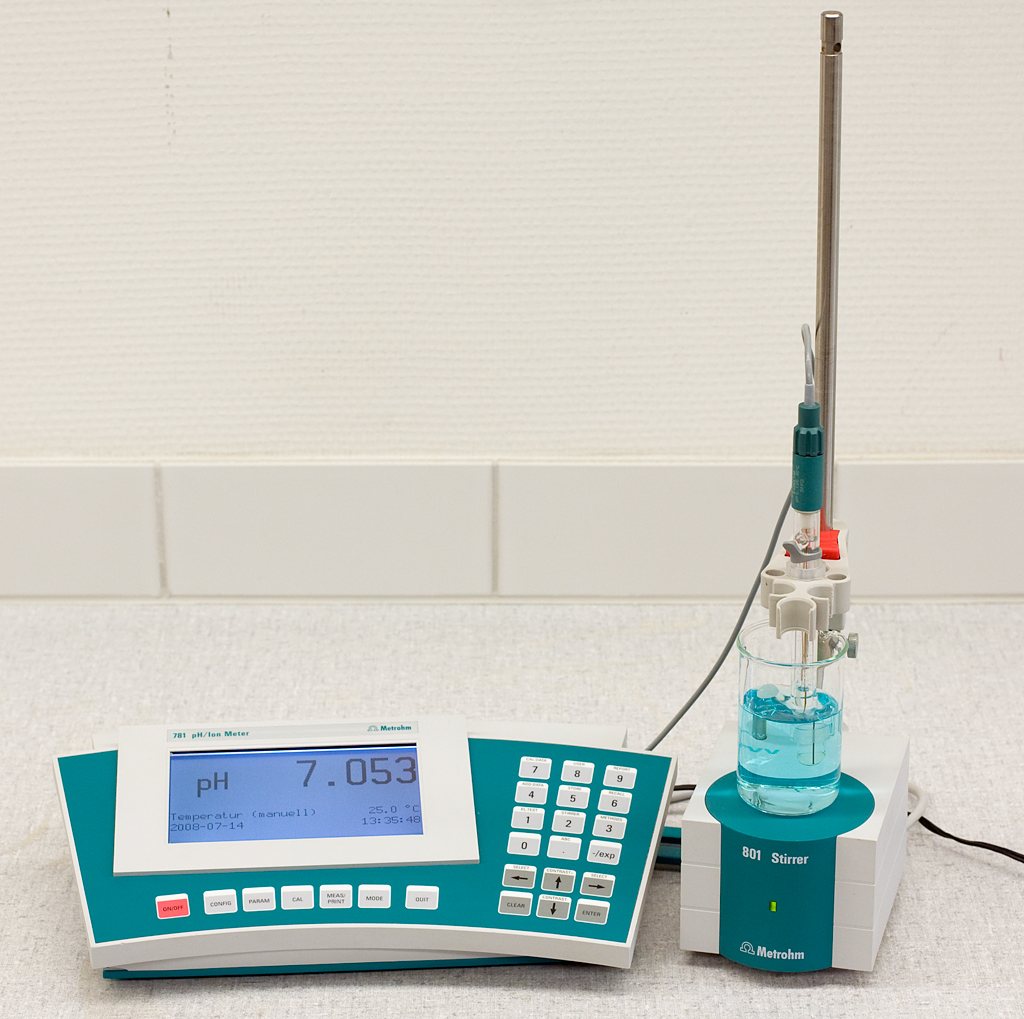
781 pH/Ion Meter pH meter by Metrohm

A pH meter is a scientific instrument that measures the hydrogen-ion activity in water-based solutions, indicating its acidity or alkalinity expressed as pH. The pH meter measures the difference in electrical potential between a pH electrode and a reference electrode, and so the pH meter is sometimes referred to as a "potentiometric pH meter". The difference in electrical potential relates to the acidity or pH of the solution. Testing of pH via pH meters (pH-metry) is used in many applications ranging from laboratory experimentation to quality control.

== Applications ==
The rate and outcome of chemical reactions taking place in water often depends on the acidity of the water, and it is therefore useful to know the acidity of the water, typically measured by means of a pH meter. Knowledge of pH is useful or critical in many situations, including chemical laboratory analyses. pH meters are used for soil measurements in agriculture, water quality for municipal water supplies, swimming pools, environmental remediation; brewing of wine or beer; manufacturing, healthcare and clinical applications such as blood chemistry; and many other applications.

Advances in the instrumentation and in detection have expanded the number of applications in which pH measurements can be conducted. The devices have been miniaturized, enabling direct measurement of pH inside of living cells. In addition to measuring the pH of liquids, specially designed electrodes are available to measure the pH of semi-solid substances, such as foods. These have tips suitable for piercing semi-solids, have electrode materials compatible with ingredients in food, and are resistant to clogging.

== Design and use ==
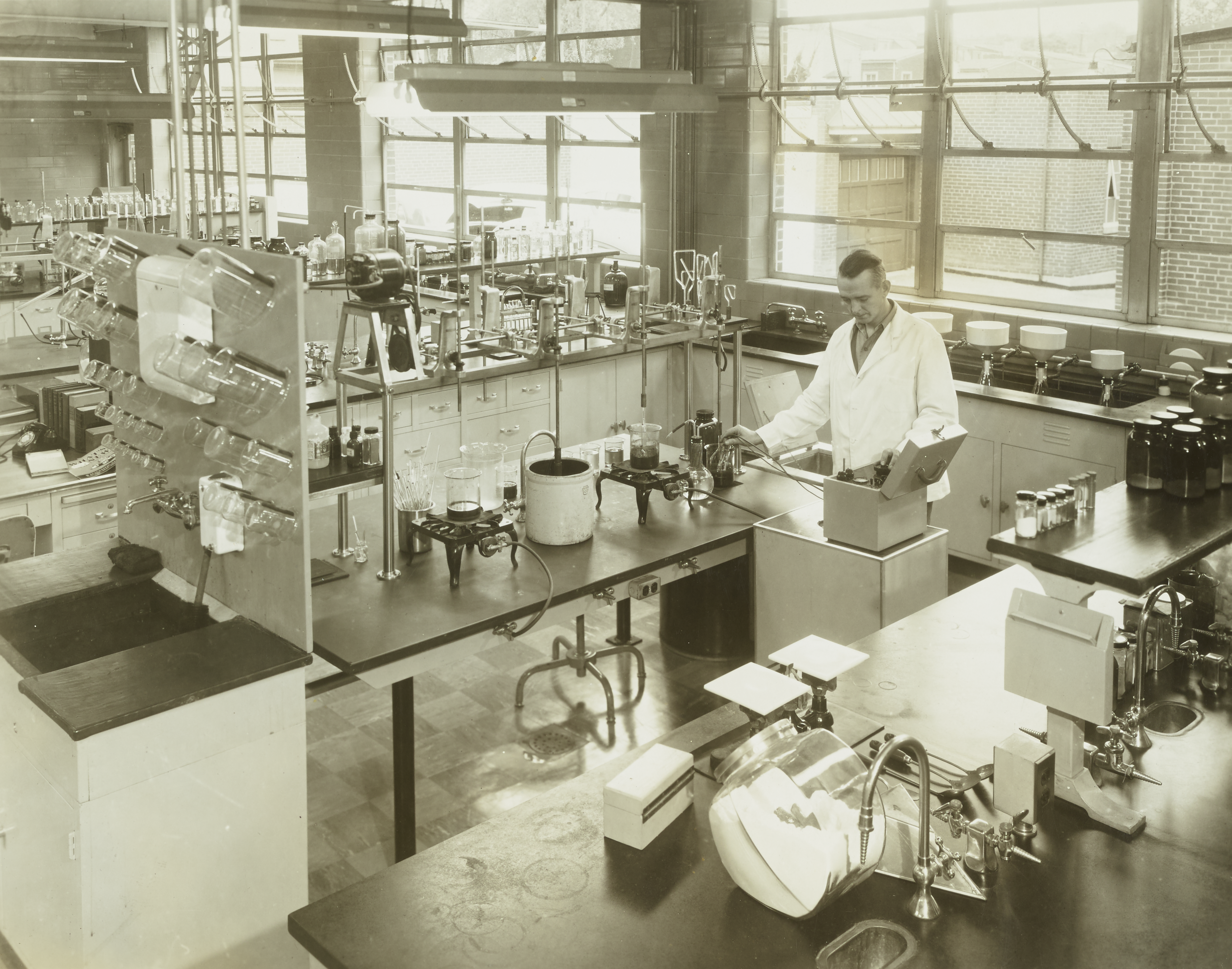
Using an early Beckman pH meter in a lab

=== Principle of operation ===
Potentiometric pH meters measure the voltage between two electrodes and display the result converted into the corresponding pH value. They comprise a simple electronic amplifier and a pair of electrodes, or alternatively a combination electrode, and some form of display calibrated in pH units. It usually has a glass electrode and a reference electrode, or a combination electrode. The electrodes, or probes, are inserted into the solution to be tested. pH meters may also be based on the antimony electrode (typically used for rough conditions) or the quinhydrone electrode.

In order to accurately measure the potential difference between the two sides of the glass membrane reference electrode, typically a silver chloride electrode or calomel electrode are required on each side of the membrane. Their purpose is to measure changes in the potential on their respective side. One is built into the glass electrode. The other, which makes contact with the test solution through a porous plug, may be a separate reference electrode or may be built into a combination electrode. The resulting voltage will be the potential difference between the two sides of the glass membrane possibly offset by some difference between the two reference electrodes, that can be compensated for. The article on the glass electrode has a good description and figure.

The design of the electrodes is the key part: These are rod-like structures usually made of glass, with a bulb containing the sensor at the bottom. The glass electrode for measuring the pH has a glass bulb specifically designed to be selective to hydrogen-ion concentration. On immersion in the solution to be tested, hydrogen ions in the test solution exchange for other positively charged ions on the glass bulb, creating an electrochemical potential across the bulb. The electronic amplifier detects the difference in electrical potential between the two electrodes generated in the measurement and converts the potential difference to pH units. The magnitude of the electrochemical potential across the glass bulb is linearly related to the pH according to the Nernst equation.

The reference electrode is insensitive to the pH of the solution, being composed of a metallic conductor, which connects to the display. This conductor is immersed in an electrolyte solution, typically potassium chloride, which comes into contact with the test solution through a porous ceramic membrane. The display consists of a voltmeter, which displays voltage in units of pH.

On immersion of the glass electrode and the reference electrode in the test solution, an electrical circuit is completed, in which there is a potential difference created and detected by the voltmeter. The circuit can be thought of as going from the conductive element of the reference electrode to the surrounding potassium-chloride solution, through the ceramic membrane to the test solution, the hydrogen-ion-selective glass of the glass electrode, to the solution inside the glass electrode, to the silver of the glass electrode, and finally the voltmeter of the display device. The voltage varies from test solution to test solution depending on the potential difference created by the difference in hydrogen-ion concentrations on each side of the glass membrane between the test solution and the solution inside the glass electrode. All other potential differences in the circuit do not vary with pH and are corrected for by means of the calibration.

For simplicity, many pH meters use a combination probe, constructed with the glass electrode and the reference electrode contained within a single probe. A detailed description of combination electrodes is given in the article on glass electrodes.

The pH meter is calibrated with solutions of known pH, typically before each use, to ensure accuracy of measurement. To measure the pH of a solution, the electrodes are used as probes, which are dipped into the test solutions and held there sufficiently long for the hydrogen ions in the test solution to equilibrate with the ions on the surface of the bulb on the glass electrode. This equilibration provides a stable pH measurement.

=== pH electrode and reference electrode design ===
Details of the fabrication and resulting microstructure of the glass membrane of the pH electrode are maintained as trade secrets by the manufacturers. However, certain aspects of design are published. Glass is a solid electrolyte, for which alkali-metal ions can carry current. The pH-sensitive glass membrane is generally spherical to simplify the manufacture of a uniform membrane. These membranes are up to 0.4 millimeters in thickness, thicker than original designs, so as to render the probes durable. The glass has silicate chemical functionality on its surface, which provides binding sites for alkali-metal ions and hydrogen ions from the solutions. This provides an ion-exchange capacity in the range of 10^{−6} to 10^{−8} mol/cm^{2}. Selectivity for hydrogen ions (H^{+}) arises from a balance of ionic charge, volume requirements versus other ions, and the coordination number of other ions. Electrode manufacturers have developed compositions that suitably balance these factors, most notably lithium glass.

The silver chloride electrode is most commonly used as a reference electrode in pH meters, although some designs use the saturated calomel electrode. The silver chloride electrode is simple to manufacture and provides high reproducibility. The reference electrode usually consists of a platinum wire that has contact with a silver/silver chloride mixture, which is immersed in a potassium chloride solution. There is a ceramic plug, which serves as a contact to the test solution, providing low resistance while preventing mixing of the two solutions.

With these electrode designs, the voltmeter is detecting potential differences of ±1400 millivolts. The electrodes are further designed to rapidly equilibrate with test solutions to facilitate ease of use. The equilibration times are typically less than one second, although equilibration times increase as the electrodes age.

=== Maintenance ===
Because of the sensitivity of the electrodes to contaminants, cleanliness of the probes is essential for accuracy and precision. Probes are generally kept moist when not in use with a medium appropriate for the particular probe, which is typically an aqueous solution available from probe manufacturers. Probe manufacturers provide instructions for cleaning and maintaining their probe designs. For illustration, one maker of laboratory-grade pH gives cleaning instructions for specific contaminants: general cleaning (15-minute soak in a solution of bleach and detergent), salt (hydrochloric acid solution followed by sodium hydroxide and water), grease (detergent or methanol), clogged reference junction (KCl solution), protein deposits (pepsin and HCl, 1% solution), and air bubbles.

=== Calibration and operation ===
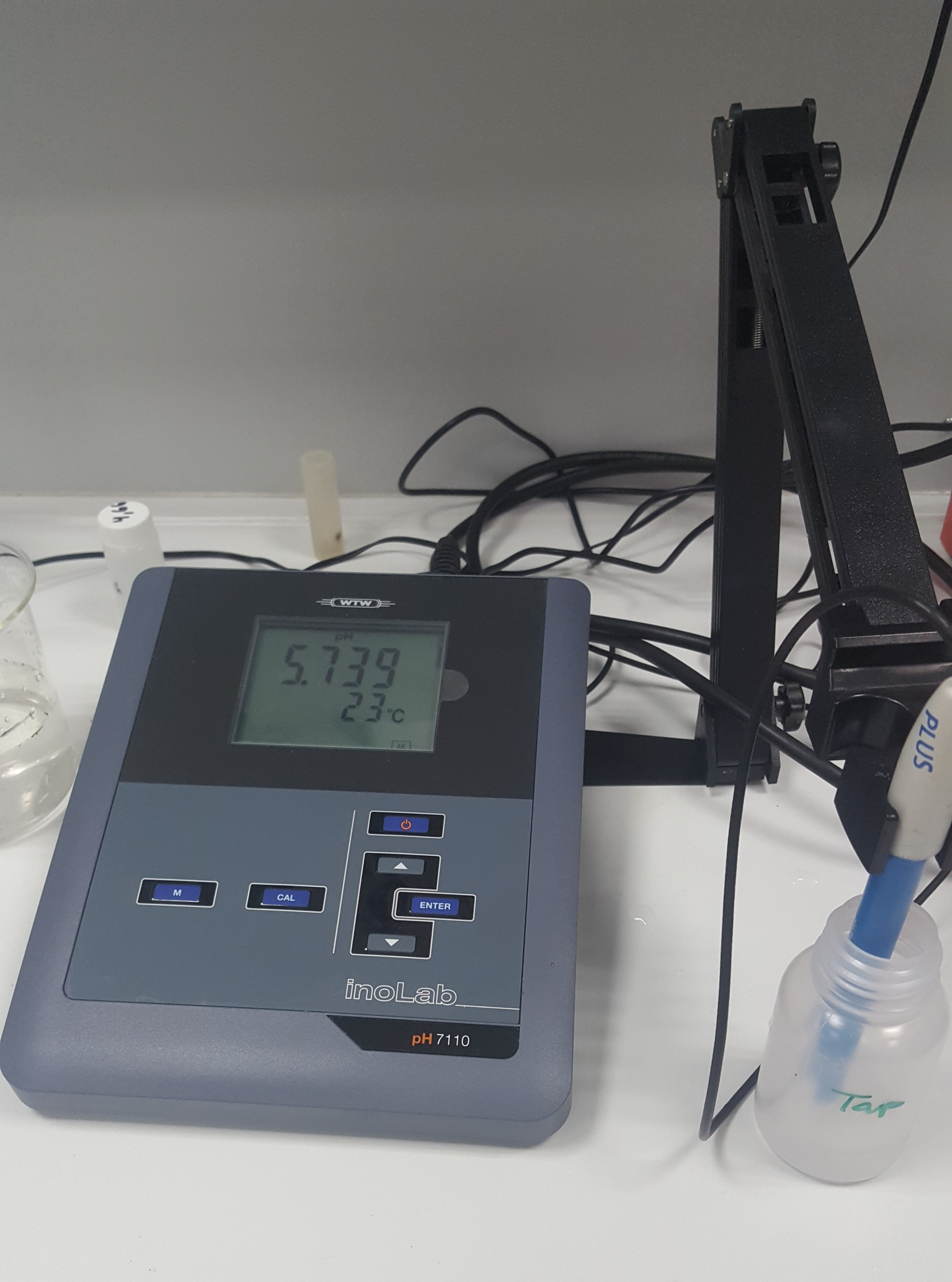
5.739 pH/Ion at 23 °C temperature shown on photo. pH 7110 pH meter manufactured by inoLab

The German Institute for Standardization publishes a standard for pH measurement using pH meters, DIN 19263.

Very precise measurements necessitate that the pH meter is calibrated before each measurement. More typically calibration is performed once per day of operation. Calibration is needed because the glass electrode does not give reproducible electrostatic potentials over longer periods of time.

Consistent with principles of good laboratory practice, calibration is performed with at least two standard buffer solutions that span the range of pH values to be measured. For general purposes, buffers at pH 4.00 and pH 10.00 are suitable. The pH meter has one calibration control to set the meter reading equal to the value of the first standard buffer and a second control to adjust the meter reading to the value of the second buffer. A third control allows the temperature to be set. Standard buffer sachets, available from a variety of suppliers, usually document the temperature dependence of the buffer control. More precise measurements sometimes require calibration at three different pH values. Some pH meters provide built-in temperature-coefficient correction, with temperature thermocouples in the electrode probes. The calibration process correlates the voltage produced by the probe (approximately 0.06 volts per pH unit) with the pH scale. Good laboratory practice dictates that, after each measurement, the probes are rinsed with distilled water or deionized water to remove any traces of the solution being measured, blotted with a scientific wipe to absorb any remaining water, which could dilute the sample and thus alter the reading, and then immersed in a storage solution suitable for the particular probe type.

== Types of pH meters ==
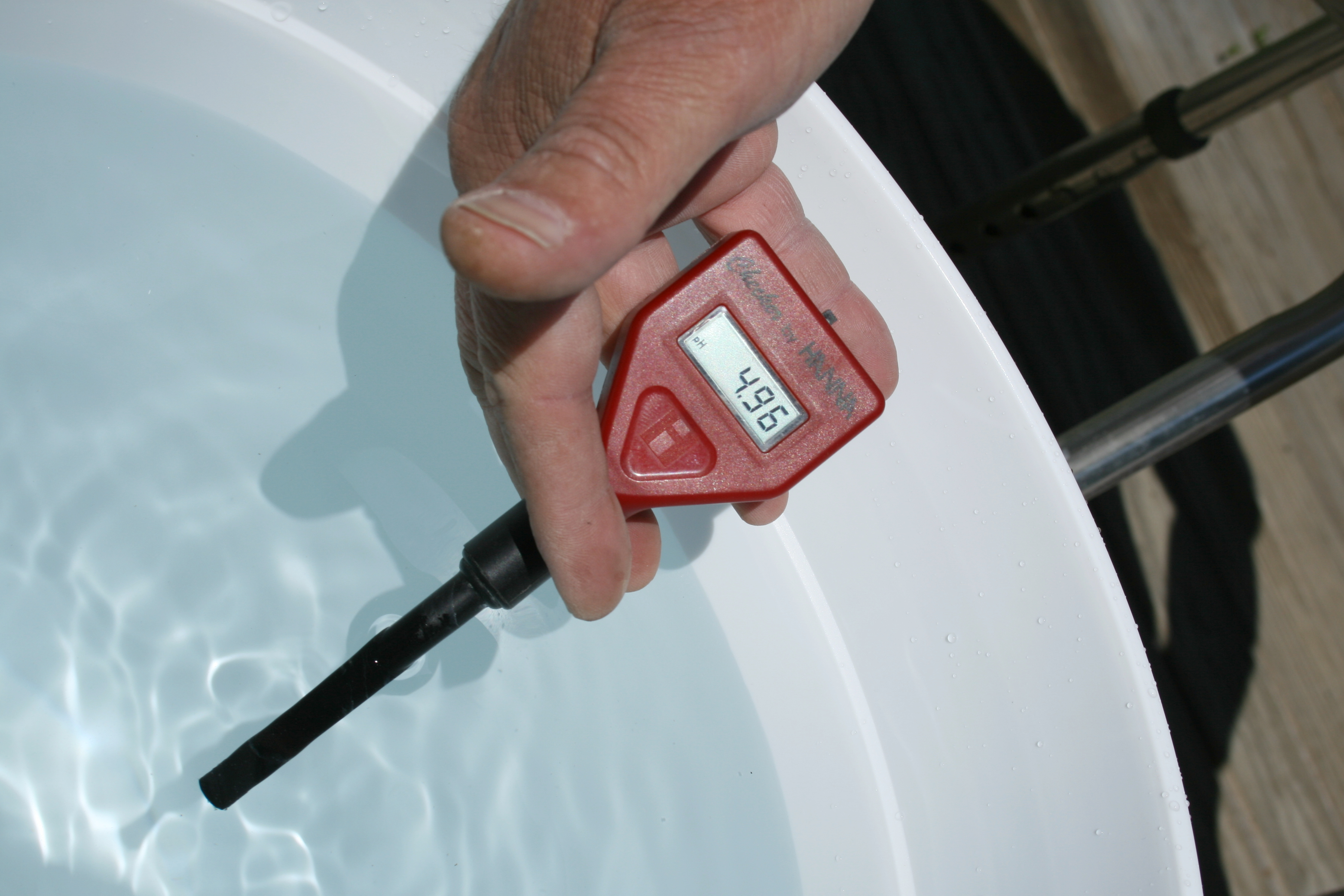
A simple pH meter

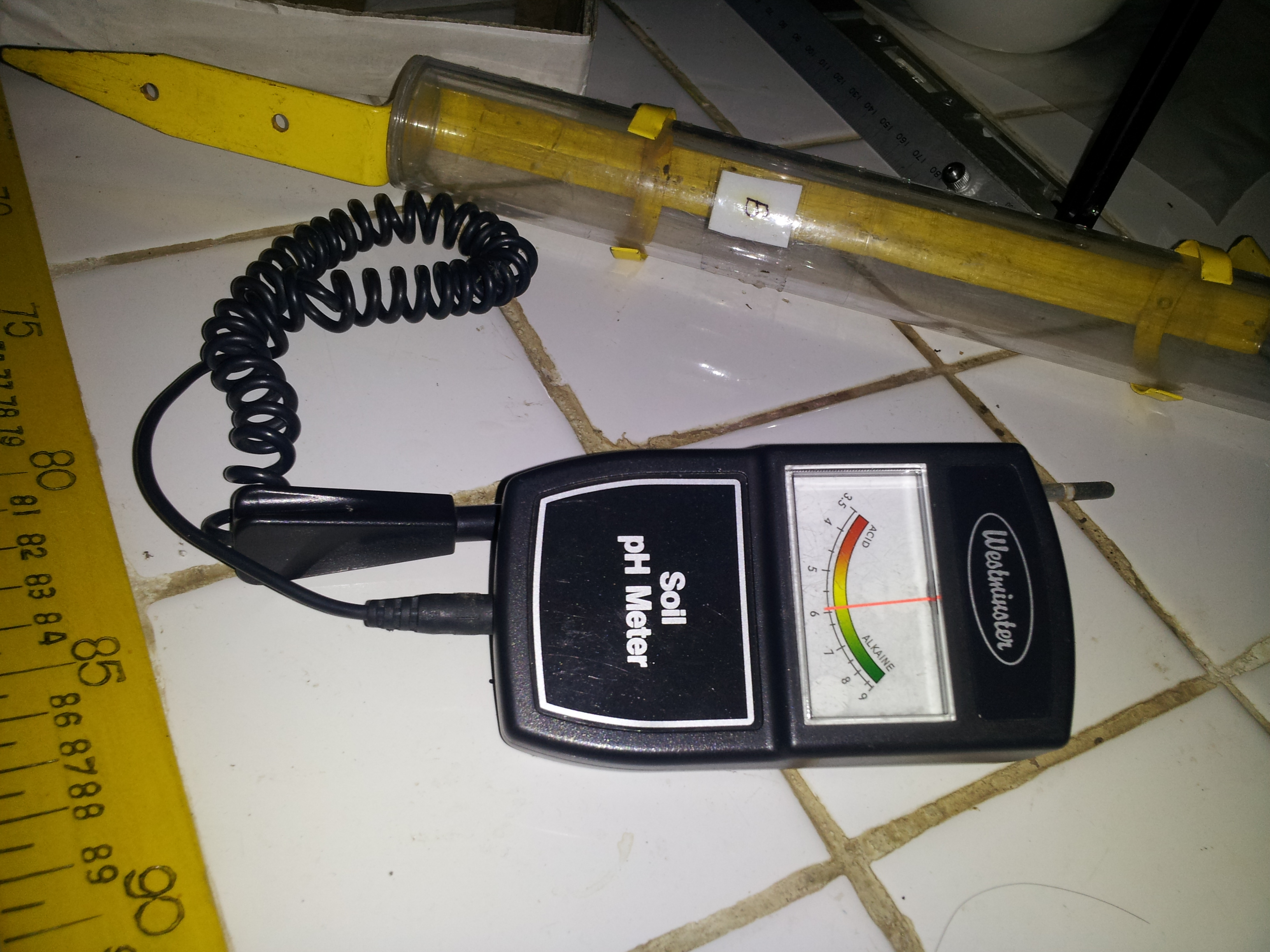
Soil pH meter

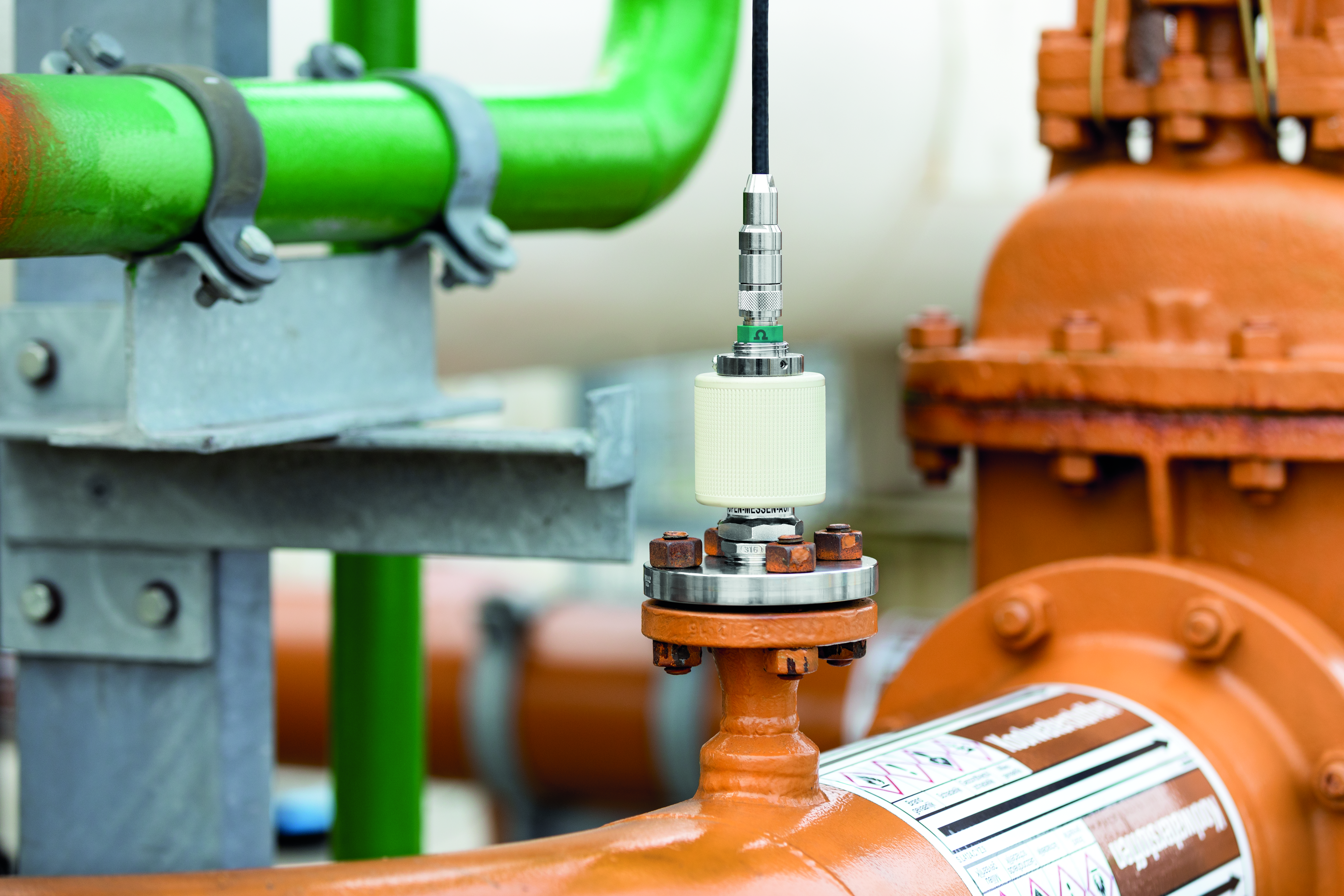
Inline pH meter by Metrohm for real-time monitoring of pH values

In general there are three major categories of pH meters. Benchtop pH meters are often used in laboratories and are used to measure samples which are brought to the pH meter for analysis. Portable, or field pH meters, are handheld pH meters that are used to take the pH of a sample in a field or production site. In-line or in situ pH meters, also called pH analyzers, are used to measure pH continuously in a process, and can stand-alone, or be connected to a higher level information system for process control.

pH meters range from simple and inexpensive pen-like devices to complex and expensive laboratory instruments with computer interfaces and several inputs for indicator and temperature measurements to be entered to adjust for the variation in pH caused by temperature. The output can be digital or analog, and the devices can be battery-powered or rely on line power. Some versions use telemetry to connect the electrodes to the voltmeter display device.

Specialty meters and probes are available for use in special applications, such as harsh environments and biological microenvironments. There are also holographic pH sensors, which allow pH measurement colorimetrically, making use of the variety of pH indicators that are available. Additionally, there are commercially available pH meters based on solid state electrodes, rather than conventional glass electrodes.

== History ==
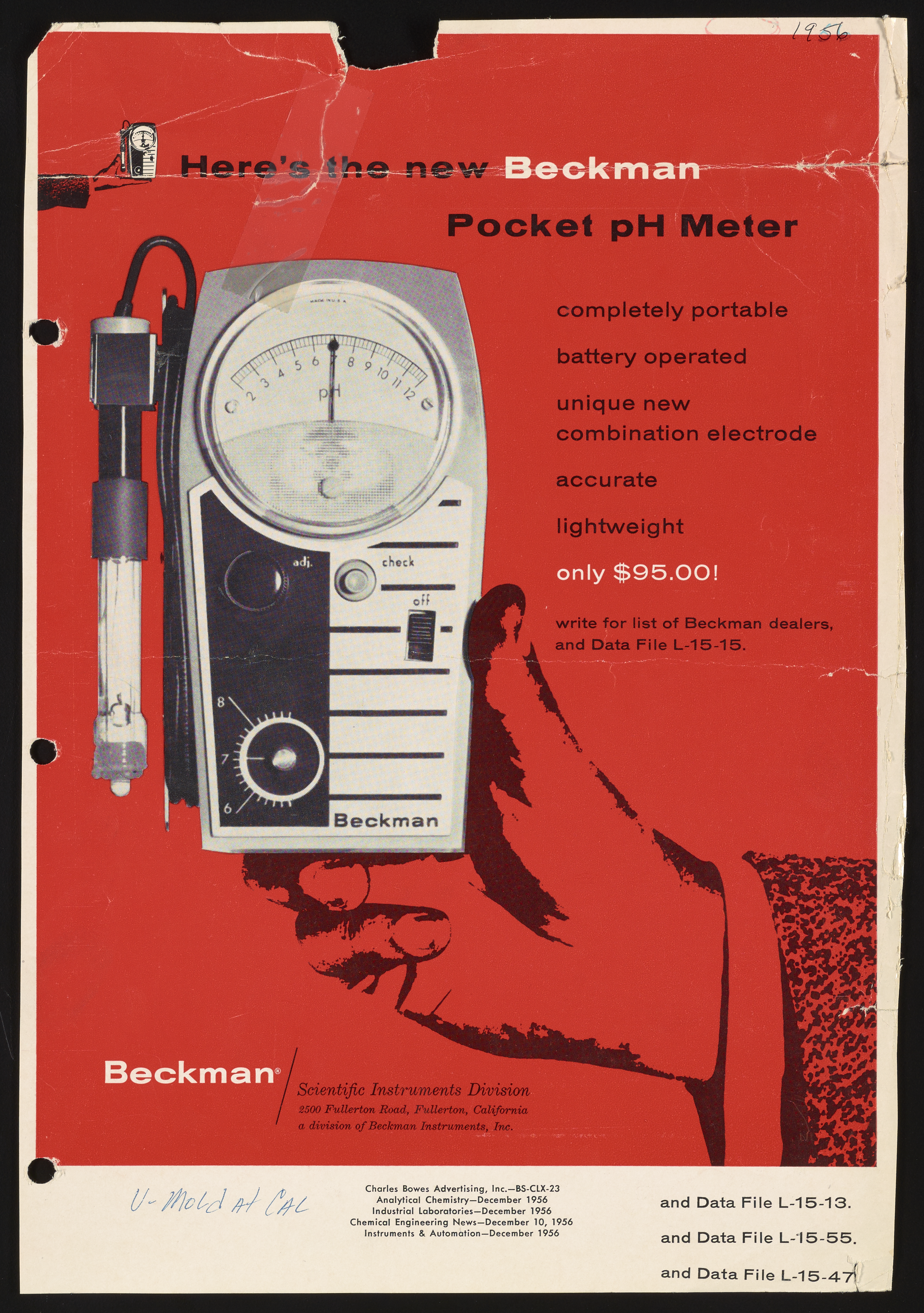
"Here's the new Beckman Pocket pH Meter", 1956

The concept of pH was defined in 1909 by S. P. L. Sørensen, and electrodes were used for pH measurement in the 1920s.

In October 1934, Arnold Orville Beckman registered the first patent for a complete chemical instrument for the measurement of pH, U.S. Patent No. 2,058,761, for his "acidimeter", later renamed the pH meter. Beckman developed the prototype as an assistant professor of chemistry at the California Institute of Technology, when asked to devise a quick and accurate method for measuring the acidity of lemon juice for the California Fruit Growers Exchange (Sunkist).

On April 8, 1935, Beckman's renamed National Technical Laboratories focused on the manufacture of scientific instruments, with the Arthur H. Thomas Company as a distributor for its pH meter. In its first full year of sales, 1936, the company sold 444 pH meters for $60,000 in sales. In years to come, the company sold millions of the units. In 2004 the Beckman pH meter was designated an ACS National Historic Chemical Landmark in recognition of its significance as the first commercially successful electronic pH meter.

The Radiometer Corporation of Denmark was founded in 1935, and began marketing a pH meter for medical use around 1936, but "the development of automatic pH-meters for industrial purposes was neglected. Instead American instrument makers successfully developed industrial pH-meters with a wide variety of applications, such as in breweries, paper works, alum works, and water treatment systems."

In the 1940s the electrodes for pH meters were often difficult to make, or unreliable due to brittle glass. Dr. Werner Ingold began to industrialize the production of single-rod measuring cells, a combination of measurement and reference electrode in one construction unit, which led to broader acceptance in a wide range of industries including pharmaceutical production.

Beckman marketed a portable "Pocket pH Meter" as early as 1956, but it did not have a digital read-out. In the 1970s Jenco Electronics of Taiwan designed and manufactured the first portable digital pH meter. This meter was sold under the label of the Cole-Parmer Corporation.

== Building a pH meter ==
Specialized manufacturing is required for the electrodes, and details of their design and construction are typically trade secrets. However, with purchase of suitable electrodes, a standard multimeter can be used to complete the construction of the pH meter. However, commercial suppliers offer voltmeter displays that simplify use, including calibration and temperature compensation.

== See also ==
- Antimony electrode
- Ion-selective electrodes
- ISFET pH electrode
- Potentiometry
- Quinhydrone electrode
- Saturated calomel electrode
- Silver chloride electrode
- Standard hydrogen electrode
