= Glass electrode =

Electrode that is pH-sensitive

Diagram showing the parts of a glass electrode.

A glass electrode is a type of ion-selective electrode made of a doped glass membrane that is sensitive to a specific ion. The most common application of ion-selective glass electrodes is for the measurement of pH. The pH electrode is an example of a glass electrode that is sensitive to hydrogen ions. Glass electrodes play an important part in the instrumentation in analytical chemistry and in physicochemical studies. The voltage of the glass electrode, relative to some reference value, is sensitive to changes in the activity of certain types of ions.

== History ==
The first studies of glass electrodes (GE) found different sensitivities of different glasses to change the medium's acidity (pH), due to the effects of the alkali metal ions.

In 1906, M. Cremer, the father of Erika Cremer, determined that the electric potential that arises between parts of the fluid, located on opposite sides of the glass membrane, is proportional to the concentration of acid (hydrogen ion concentration).

In 1909, S. P. L. Sørensen introduced the concept of pH, and in the same year F. Haber and Z. Klemensiewicz reported results of their research on the glass electrode in The Society of Chemistry in Karlsruhe.

In 1922, W. S. Hughes showed that alkali-silicate glass electrodes (containing silanols) are similar to hydrogen electrodes, as both are reversible concerning H^{+}.

In 1925, P. M. Tookey Kerridge developed the first glass electrode for the analysis of blood samples and highlighted some of the practical problems with the equipment such as the high resistance of glass (50–150 MΩ). During her PhD, Kerridge developed a glass electrode aimed to measure small volume of solution. Her clever and careful design was a pioneering work in the making of glass electrodes.

== Applications ==
Glass electrodes are commonly used for pH measurements. There are also specialized ion-sensitive glass electrodes used for the determination of the concentration of lithium, sodium, ammonium, and other ions.

Glass electrodes find a wide diversity of uses in a large range of applications including research labs, control of industrial processes, analysis of foods and cosmetics, monitoring of environmental pollution, or soil acidity measurements. Micro-electrodes are specifically designed for pH measurements on very small volumes of fluid, direct measurements in geochemical micro-environments, or determining the electrical potential of the cell membrane in biochemical studies.

Heavy duty electrodes capable of withstanding several tens of bar of hydraulic pressure also allow for measurements in water wells in deep aquifers. Additionally, they can be used to directly determine in situ the pH of pore water in deep clay formations. For long-term in situ measurements, it is critical to minimize KCl leakage from the reference electrode compartment (Ag / AgCl / KCl 3 M), use glycerol-free electrodes to avoid fuelling microbial growth, and prevent unexpected but severe perturbations related to bacterial activity (pH decrease due to sulfate-reducing bacteria, or methanogen bacteria).

== Types ==
All commercial electrodes somewhat selectively respond to single-charged ions, such as H^{+}, Na^{+}, Ag^{+}. The most common glass electrode is the pH-electrode. Only a few chalcogenide glass electrodes are presently known to be sensitive to double-charged ions, such as Pb^{2+}, Cd^{2+}, and some other divalent cations.

There are two main types of glass-forming systems:

1. The most common one: a silicate matrix based on an amorphous molecular network of silicon dioxide (SiO_{2}, the network former) with additions of other metal oxides (network modifiers), such as Na, K, Li, Al, B, Ca..., and;
2. A less used one: a chalcogenide matrix based on a molecular network of AsS, AsSe, or AsTe.

== Interfering ions ==
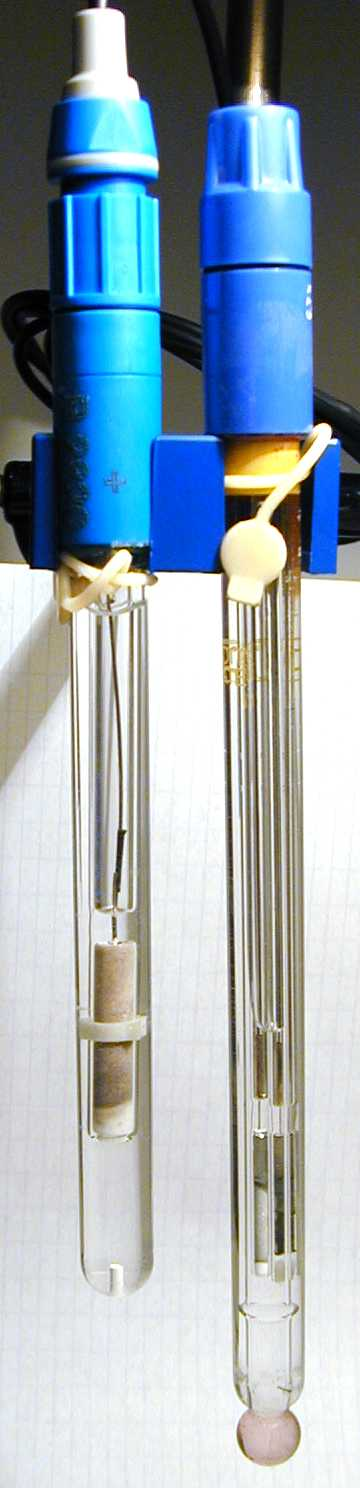
A silver chloride reference electrode (left) and glass pH electrode (right)

Because of the ion-exchanging nature of the glass membrane, it is possible for some other ions to concurrently interact with ion-exchange sites of the glass, distorting the linear dependence of the measured electrode potential on pH or other electrode functions. In some cases, it is possible to change the electrode function from one ion to another. For example, some silicate pPNA electrodes can be changed to pAg function by soaking in a silver salt solution.

Interference effects are commonly described by the semi-empirical Nikolsky-Shultz-Eisenman equation, an extension to the Nernst equation. It is given by:

$$E=E^0 + \frac{RT}{z_iF} \ln \left [ a_i + \sum_{j} \left ( k_{ij}a_j^{z_i/z_j} \right ) \right ]$$

where E is the electromotive force (emf), E^{0} the standard electrode potential, z the ionic valency including its sign, a the activity, i the ion of interest, j the interfering ions and k_{ij} is the selectivity coefficient quantifying the ion-exchange equilibrium between the ions i and j. The smaller the selectivity coefficient, the less is the interference by j.

To see the interfering effect of Na^{+} to a pH-electrode:

$$E=E^0 + \frac{RT}{F} \ln \left ( a_{\text{H}^+} + k_{\text{H}^+,\text{Na}^+}a_{\text{Na}^+} \right )$$

== Range of a pH glass electrode ==
The pH range at constant concentration can be divided into 3 parts:

Scheme of the typical dependence E (Volt) – pH for glass electrode.

- Undisturbed electrode function, where potential linearly depends on pH, realizing an ion-selective electrode for hydronium:

$$E=E^0 - \frac{2.303RT}{F} \text{pH}$$

where F is Faraday's constant (see Nernst equation).

- Alkaline error range – at low concentration of hydrogen ions (high values of pH) contributions of interfering alkali metals ions (such as Li^{+}, Na^{+}, K^{+}) are comparable with one of the hydrogen ions. In this situation dependence of the potential on pH become non-linear and often time-dependent.

The effect is usually noticeable at pH > 12, and at concentrations of lithium or sodium ions of 0.1 mol/L or more. Potassium ions usually cause a smaller error than sodium ions.

- Acidic error range – at a very high concentration of hydrogen ions (low values of pH) the dependence of the electrode on pH becomes non-linear, and the influence of the anions in the solution also becomes noticeable. These effects usually become noticeable at pH < +1.

Special electrodes exist for working in extreme pH ranges.

== Construction ==
Scheme of typical pH glass electrode.

A typical modern pH probe is a combination electrode, which combines both the glass and reference electrodes into one body. The combination electrode consists of the following parts (see the drawing):

1. A sensing part of electrode, a bulb made from a specific glass.
2. Internal electrode, usually silver chloride electrode or calomel electrode.
3. Internal solution, usually a pH=7 buffered solution of 0.1 mol/L KCl for pH electrodes or 0.1 mol/L MCl for pM electrodes.
4. When using the silver chloride electrode, a small amount of AgCl can precipitate inside the glass electrode.
5. Reference electrode, usually the same type as 2.
6. Reference internal solution, usually 3.0 mol/L KCl.
7. Junction with studied solution, usually made from ceramics or capillary with asbestos or quartz fiber.
8. Body of electrode, made from non-conductive glass or plastics.

The bottom of a pH electrode balloons out into a round thin glass bulb. The pH electrode is best thought of as a tube within a tube. The inner tube contains an unchanging buffer solution, usually made of K2HPO4 and KH2PO4 near pH 7.0. Also inside the inner tube is the cathode terminus of the reference probe. The anodic terminus wraps itself around the outside of the inner tube and ends with the same sort of reference probe as was on the inside of the inner tube. It is filled with a reference solution of KCl and has contact with the solution on the outside of the pH probe by way of a porous plug that serves as a salt bridge.

== Galvanic cell schematic representation ==
This section describes the functioning of two distinct types of electrodes as one unit which combines both the glass electrode and the reference electrode into one body. It deserves some explanation.

This device is essentially a galvanic cell that can be schematically and exemplary represented as:

Cu(s) | Ag(s) | AgCl(s) | internal solution, e.g. 0.1 M KCl(aq), K2HPO4 + KH2PO4 buffer| glass membrane | Test Solution || reference electrode solution, e.g. KCl(aq) + sat.AgCl solution | AgCl(s) | Ag | Cu ,

where | denotes an interface with a voltage difference between different physical phases, and || denotes liquid junction, that slows down a mixing between two different liquids while minimizing the diffusion potential. Ideally the || junction should have a zero volt potential difference.

In this schematic representation of the galvanic cell, one will note the symmetry between the left and the right members as seen from the center of the row occupied by the "Test Solution" (the solution whose pH must be measured). In other words, the glass membrane and the ceramic junction occupy both the same relative places in each electrode. By using the same electrodes on the left and right, any potentials generated at the interfaces cancel each other (in principle), resulting in the system voltage being dependent only on the interaction of the glass membrane and the test solution.

The measuring part of the electrode, the glass bulb on the bottom, is coated both inside and out with a ~10 nm layer of a hydrated gel. These two layers are separated by a layer of dry glass. The silica glass structure (that is, the conformation of its atomic structure) is shaped so that it allows Na^{+} ions some mobility. The metal cations (Na^{+}) in the hydrated gel diffuse out of the glass and into solution while H^{+} from solution can diffuse into the hydrated gel. It is the hydrated gel which makes the pH electrode an ion-selective electrode.

H^{+} does not cross through the glass membrane of the pH electrode, it is the Na^{+} which crosses and leads to a change in free energy. When an ion diffuses from a region of activity to another region of activity, there is a free energy change and this is what the pH meter actually measures. The hydrated gel membrane is connected by Na^{+} transport and thus the concentration of H^{+} on the outside of the membrane is 'relayed' to the inside of the membrane by Na^{+}.

All glass pH electrodes have extremely high electric resistance from 50 to 500 MΩ. Therefore, the glass electrode can be used only with a high input-impedance measuring device like a pH meter, or, more generically, a high input-impedance voltmeter which is called an electrometer.

=== Limitations ===
The glass electrode has some inherent limitations due to the nature of its construction. Acid and alkaline errors are discussed above. An important limitation results from the existence of asymmetry potentials that are present at glass/liquid interfaces. The existence of these phenomena means that glass electrodes must always be calibrated before use; a common method of calibration involves the use of standard buffer solutions. Also, there is a slow deterioration due to diffusion into and out of the internal solution. These effects are masked when the electrode is calibrated against buffer solutions but deviations from ideal response are easily observed by means of a Gran plot. Typically, the slope of the electrode response decreases over a period of months.

== Storage ==
Between measurements, any glass or membrane electrodes should be kept in a solution of their own ion. It is necessary to prevent the glass membrane from drying out because its performance is dependent on the existence of a hydrated layer, which forms slowly.

== See also ==
- Potentiometry
- Ion-selective electrodes
- ISFET pH electrode
- Chalcogenide glass
- Quinhydrone electrode
