= DHE =

DHE can refer to:

- Dhe (Cyrillic)
- Dihydroergotamine
- Design Human Engineering, a methodology of psychological influence developed by Richard Bandler
- Diffie–Hellman key exchange, a method of exchanging cryptographic keys
- Dynamic hydrogen electrode, a reference electrode in electrochemistry
