= Severinghaus electrode =

The Severinghaus electrode is an electrode that measures carbon dioxide (CO_{2}). It was developed by Dr. John W. Severinghaus and his technician A. Freeman Bradley in 1958.

It utilizes a CO_{2}-sensitive glass electrode in a surrounding film of bicarbonate solution covered by a thin plastic carbon dioxide permeable membrane, but impermeable to water and electrolytic solutes. The carbon dioxide pressure of a sample gas or liquid equilibrates through the membrane and the glass electrode measures the resulting pH of the bicarbonate solution.

$\ce{CO2 + H2O <=> H2CO3 <=> HCO3- + H+}$

Clark, galvanic, and paramagnetic electrodes measure oxygen. Severinghaus electrode measures CO_{2}. Sanz electrode measures pH.
