= Phyllis Margaret Tookey Kerridge =

Chemist and physiologist

Phyllis Margaret Tookey Kerridge MRCP
- Born: Phyllis Margaret Tookey; April 1901; Bromley, Kent, England
- Died: 22 June 1940 (aged 39)
- Occupations: Physiologist, chemist
- Years active: 1922–1940
- Known for: Inventing the miniature pH electrode Improving the Bragg-Paul pulsator (used for artificial respiration); Developing audiometric standards for hearing tests
- Notable work: The Use of the Glass Electrode in Biochemistry; Principles of physical chemistry for medical students Tests for the hearing of speech by deaf people
- Spouse: William Kerridge

Phyllis Margaret Tookey Kerridge (April 1901 – 22 June 1940) was a British chemist and physiologist. She is notable for creating the miniature pH electrode, her work on artificial respiration, and her pioneering work shaping the discipline of audiometry.

== Early life and education ==
Phyllis Margaret Tookey was born in April 1901, the only daughter of consulting engineer William Alfred and Minnie Tookey of Bromley, Kent. She had two younger brothers. She studied at the City of London School for Girls, where she performed well in science. She then studied chemistry and physics at UCL, obtaining her honours degree in 1922. She completed her PhD, with a thesis on the Use of the Glass Electrode in Biochemistry, in 1927. In 1926, she appears to have married William Henry Kerridge and moved from her family home to St. Petersburgh Place. Whilst acting as a lecturer in the UCL department of physiology, she also studied medicine at University College Hospital, qualifying in 1933 and obtaining MRCP in 1937. She was a committee member of the Women's Union Society in her student days.

== Scientific career ==
Kerridge worked at UCL; the Marine Biological Association, Plymouth; the Physiological Laboratory, Cambridge; the Carlsberg Chemical Laboratorium, Copenhagen; the Medical Unit of the London Hospital; the London School of Hygiene and Tropical Medicine, and University College Hospital, London (from which she was seconded by the Emergency Medical Service to St. Margaret's Hospital during the war).

=== Invention of the miniature pH electrode ===
In 1925, supported by DSIR and MRC funding, Kerridge published a paper on her invention of a glass electrode for analysing biochemical samples such as blood. For her biochemical PhD research, Kerridge had required a tool able to measure the pH of very small volume of solution, but the design of existing pH electrodes was unsuitable because they provided only very small signals. Kerridge noted challenges in developing this equipment, including the high resistance of glass, danger of breakage to the delicate apparatus, and risk of short circuit.

=== Artificial respiration ===
After qualifying in medicine in the early 1930s, Kerridge was recommended by Dr Edward Poulton to scientific instrument maker Robert W. Paul, who sought someone to conduct rigorous physiological tests on a respirator called the "pulsator" created by William Henry Bragg. Kerridge's tests provided extensive physiological measurements that improved the efficiency of the device, and she also suggested improvements to the design that reduced its complexity and bulk. Mr S. Crosby Halahan, Bragg's neighbour and the inspiration for his respirator, was kept alive via artificial respiration for two years after becoming completely paralysed – Kerridge adapted the design to make it more comfortable for him.

In addition to doing much to improve the design of the respirator, Kerridge also played an active role in publicising it. She had photographs taken of her laboratory assistant wearing the device, advised Bragg and Paul to publish their introduction in the Proceedings of the Royal Society of Medicine, and wrote about the features of the case for The Lancet in order that it would reach the attention of General practitioners.

=== Work on deafness and hearing aids ===
Later in the 1930s, Kerridge worked at the Royal Ear Hospital and developed audiometric standards for hearing tests. Kerridge also played a significant role in establishing hearing aid clinics for the deaf. Her keen interest in music inspired her sympathy for those with hearing loss. This work particularly focussed on the incidence of deafness in children, and she encouraged her students to accompany her on visits to slums to explore potential factors in the etiology of deafness in school-children. In 1936, the Medical Research Council funded her to test the hearing of schoolchildren across London. Her data was garnered from experiments in the ‘silence room’, a soundproof room of some 3,500 cubic feet in the basement of University College Hospital on Huntley Street in London. This was the first site in Great Britain to have a permanent Western Electric Audiometer that used pure-tone testing rather than speech recording.

=== Collaborations with the British Post Office ===
Kerridge's expertise in hearing aid technology was used by the British Post Office in its attempts to improve sound quality over telephone lines. The Post Office engineers were initially concerned with Kerridge’s discussion of bone conduction and quoted her extensively in their exploration of improvements to amplified telephony reports. However, she collaborated with the Post Office more extensively when she tested the hearing of telephonists using her audiometer, and in 1937 she installed Post Office amplified telephones designed for people with hearing loss into her clinic. The results of her clinical tests provided data that the Post Office used to improve its amplified telephone service, and the phonetic tests that Kerridge had created with Dennis Butler Fry were later used in the Post Office's design of the Medresco - the first NHS hearing aid.

=== Second World War ===
At the outbreak of the war, Kerridge was working at University College Hospital. She was seconded from there to serve the Emergency Medical Service at St Margaret's Hospital, Epping. There, Kerridge and her colleagues created an improvised laboratory for work in pathology and blood transfusions.

In 1940, Kerridge died aged 38.
