= Silver chloride electrode =

Common type of reference electrode in electrochemistry

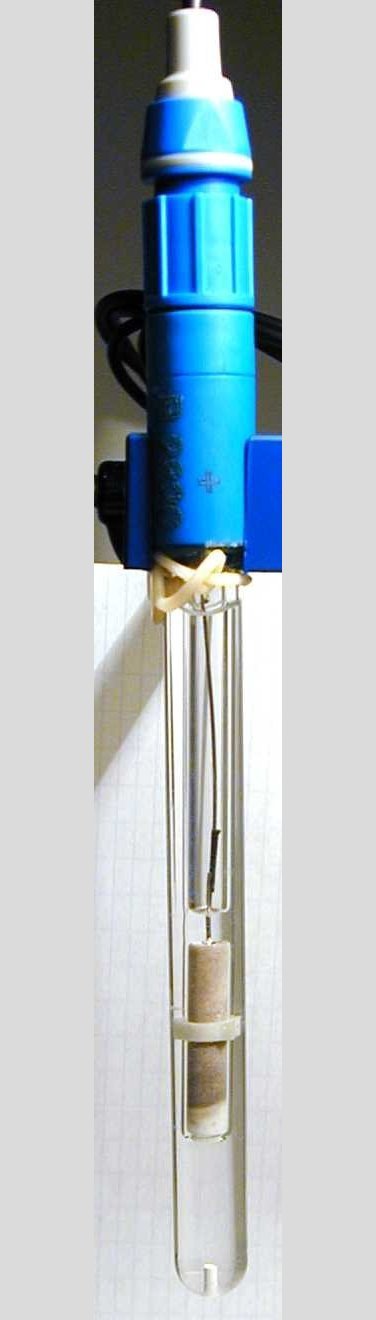
Ag-AgCl reference electrode

A silver chloride electrode is a type of reference electrode, commonly used in electrochemical measurements. For environmental reasons it has widely replaced the saturated calomel electrode. For example, it is usually the internal reference electrode in pH meters and it is often used as reference in reduction potential measurements. As an example of the latter, the silver chloride electrode is the most commonly used reference electrode for testing cathodic protection corrosion control systems in sea water environments.

The electrode functions as a reversible redox electrode and the equilibrium is between the solid (s) silver metal (Ag(s)) and its solid salt—silver chloride (AgCl(s), also called silver(I) chloride) in a chloride solution of a given concentration.

In electrochemical cell notation, the silver chloride electrode is written as, e.g., for an electrolyte solution of KCl 3 M:

$$\ce{{Ag(s)} \ | \ {AgCl(s)} \ | \ KCl(aq) \ (3M)}$$

The corresponding half-reaction can be presented as follows:

$$\ce{AgCl(s) + e^- <=> Ag(s) + Cl^- (aq)}$$

Which is a summary of these two reactions:

$$\ce{Ag^+ (aq) + e^- <=> Ag(s)}$$
$$\ce{AgCl(s) <=> Ag^+ (aq) + Cl^- (aq)}$$

AgCl does not form by direct combination of Ag^{+} and Cl^{−}, rather through the transformation of soluble species AgCl_{n + 1}^{–n} (0 ≤ n ≤ 3) first formed from the combination of the Ag^{+} and Cl^{−} into the solid AgCl phase.

This reaction is a reversible reaction and is characterized by fast electrode kinetics, meaning that a sufficiently high current can be passed through the electrode with 100% efficiency of the redox reaction (anodic oxidation and dissolution of the Ag metal along with cathodic reduction and deposition of the Ag^{+} ions as Ag metal onto the surface of the Ag wire). The reaction has been proven to obey these equations in solutions of pH values between 0 and 13.5.

The Nernst equation below shows the dependence of the potential of the silver-silver(I) chloride electrode on the activity or effective concentration of chloride-ions:

$$E = E^0 - \frac{RT}{F} \ln a_\ce{Cl-}$$

The exact standard potential given by an IUPACreview paper is +0.22249 V, with a standard deviation of 0.13 mV at 25 °C. The potential is, however, very sensitive to traces of bromide ions which make it more negative.

== Applications ==
Commercial reference electrodes consist of a glass or plastic tube electrode body. The electrode consists of a metallic silver wire (Ag_{(s)}) coated with a thin layer of silver chloride (AgCl), either physically by dipping the wire in molten silver chloride, chemically by electroplating the wire in concentrated hydrochloric acid (HCl) or electrochemically by oxidising the silver at an anode in a chloride solution.

A porous (or fibrous) filter located at/near the tip of the reference electrode allows to establishing a liquid contact between the solution to be measured and the electrolyte solution in equilibrium with the silver chloride (AgCl) coating the Ag_{(s)} surface. An insulated electrical wire connects the silver rod with the measuring instrument. The voltmeter negative terminal is connected to the test wire.

The electrode body contains potassium chloride to stabilize the silver chloride concentration. When working in seawater, this body can be removed and the chloride concentration is fixed by the stable salinity of seawater. The potential of a silver:silver chloride reference electrode with respect to the standard hydrogen electrode depends on the composition of the electrolyte solution and on temperature.

Reference Electrode Potentials
Electrode	Potential (E^{0} + E_{lj})	Temperature coefficient
(Unit) at room temperature	(Volt, V) at 25 °C	(mV/°C) at ~ 25 °C
Standard hydrogen electrode (SHE)	0.000	0.000
Ag/AgCl/saturated KCl	+0.197	+0.214
Ag/AgCl/3.5 mol/kg KCl	+0.205	?
Ag/AgCl/3.0 mol/kg KCl	+0.210	?
Ag/AgCl/1.0 mol/kg KCl	+0.235	+0.235
Ag/AgCl/0.6 mol/kg KCl	+0.250	?
Ag/AgCl (seawater)	+0.266	?

Notes to this table:
(1) The table data source is NACE International (National Association of Corrosion Engineers), except where a separate reference is given.
(2) E_{lj} is the liquid junction potential between the given electrolyte and a reference electrolyte with a molal activity of chloride of 1 mol/kg.

The electrode has many features making it suitable for use in the field:

- Stable potential
- Non-toxic components
- Simple construction
- Inexpensive to manufacture

They are usually manufactured with saturated potassium chloride electrolyte, but can be used with lower concentrations such as 1 mol/kg potassium chloride. As noted above, changing the electrolyte concentration changes the electrode potential. Thus care should be taken to either use silver chloride reference electrodes in a frit-sealed chamber of saturated potassium chloride (see picture above), or for the quasi-reference electrode configuration (silver wire coated in silver chloride with no frit or potassium chloride reservoir), ensure the local chloride concentration is both constant and sufficiently high to maintain a stable potential and stable silver chloride layer. Silver chloride is slightly soluble in strong potassium chloride solutions, so it is sometimes recommended the potassium chloride be saturated with silver chloride to avoid stripping the silver chloride off the silver wire.

=== Biological electrode systems ===
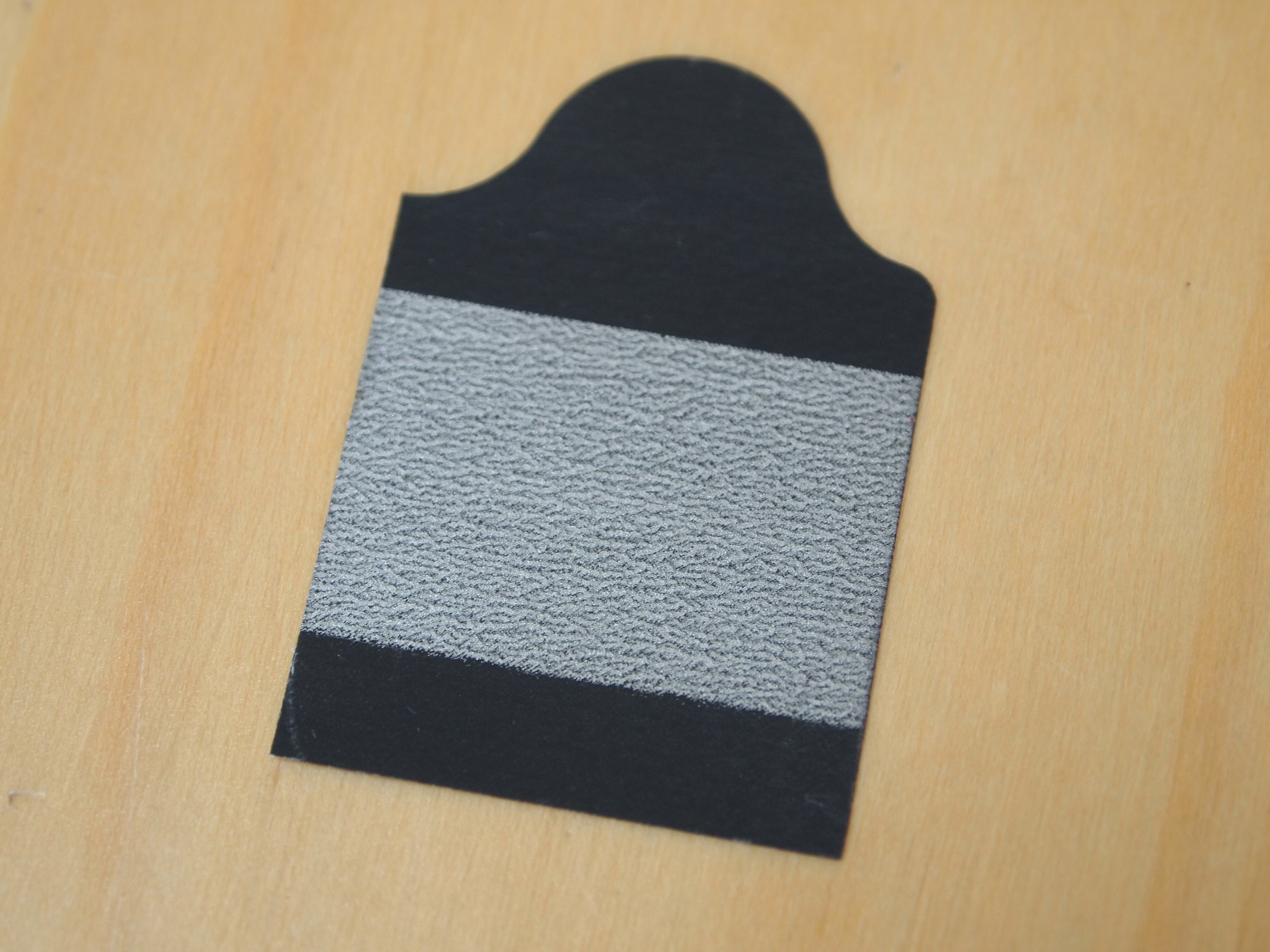
Tab electrode using silver/silver chloride sensing for electrocardiography (ECG)

Silver chloride electrodes are also used by many applications of biological electrode systems such as biomonitoring sensors as part of electrocardiography (ECG) and electroencephalography (EEG), and in transcutaneous electrical nerve stimulation (TENS) to deliver current. Historically, the electrodes were fabricated from pure silver, or from metals such as tin, nickel, or brass (an alloy of copper and zinc) coated with a thin film of silver. In today's applications, most biomonitoring electrodes are silver/silver chloride sensors which are fabricated by coating a thin layer of silver on plastic substrates while the outer layer of silver is converted to silver chloride.

The principle of silver/silver chloride sensors operation is the conversion of ion current at the surface of human tissues to electron current to be delivered through an electrical wire to the measurement instrument. An important component of the operation is the electrolyte gel applied between the electrode and the tissues. The gel contains free chloride ions such that the ion charge can be carried through the electrolyte solution. Therefore, the electrolyte solution has the same conductivity for the ion current as the human tissues. When the ion current develops, the metallic silver atoms (Ag_{(s)}) of the electrode oxidize and it releases Ag^{+} cations to the solution while the discharged electrons carry the electrical charge through the electrical wire. At the same time, the chloride anions (Cl^{−}) present in the electrolyte solution travel towards the anode (positively charged electrode) where they are precipitated as silver chloride (AgCl) as they bond with the silver cations (Ag^{+}) present onto the Ag_{(s)} electrode surface. The reaction allows the ion current to pass from the electrolyte solution to the electrode while the electron current passes through the electrical wire connected to the measuring instrument.

When there is an uneven distribution of cations and anions, there will be a small voltage called half-cell potential associated with the current. In the direct current (DC) system that is used by the ECG and EEG instruments, the difference between the half-cell potential and the zero potential is shown as DC offset which is an undesirable characteristic. Silver/silver chloride is a common choice of biological electrodes due to its low half-cell potential of about +222 mV (SHE), low impedance, with a toxicity lower than that of the calomel electrode containing mercury.

== Elevated temperature application ==
When appropriately constructed, the silver chloride electrode can be used up to 300 °C. The standard potential (i.e., the potential when the chloride activity is 1 mol/kg) of the silver chloride electrode is a function of temperature as follows:

Temperature dependence of the standard potential (E^{0}) of the silver/silver chloride electrode
Temperature	Potential E^{0} versus SHE at the same temperature
(°C)	(Volt)
25	0.22233
60	0.1968
125	0.1330
150	0.1032
175	0.0708
200	0.0348
225	-0.0051
250	-0.054
275	-0.090

Bard et al. give the following correlations for the standard potential of the silver chloride electrode between 0 and 95 °C as a function of temperature (where t is temperature in °C):

$$E^{0}(V)=0.23659-\left(4.8564\times 10^{-4}\right) t-\left(3.4205\times 10^{-6}\right) t^2-\left(5.869\times 10^{-9}\right) t^3$$

The same source also gives the fit to the high-temperature potential between 25 and 275 °C, which reproduces the data in the table above:

$$E^{0}(V)=0.23735-\left(5.3783\times 10^{-4}\right) t-\left(2.3728\times 10^{-6}\right) t^2$$

The extrapolation to 300 °C gives $E^{0}(V)=-0.138 \ \mathrm{V}$.

Farmer gives the following correction for the potential of the silver chloride electrode with 0.1 mol/kg KCl solution between 25 and 275 °C, accounting for the activity of Cl^{−} at the elevated temperature:

$$E^{0.1 \ \ce{mol/kg \ KCl}}(V)=0.23735-\left(5.3783\times 10^{-4}\right) t-\left(2.3728\times 10^{-6}\right) t^2+\left(2.2671\times 10^{-4}\right) (t+273)$$

== See also ==
- Reference electrode
- Saturated calomel electrode
- Standard hydrogen electrode
- Copper-copper(II) sulfate electrode
- Cathodic protection
- Electromyography (especially electrodes used for surface EMG)

For use in soil they are usually manufactured with saturated potassium chloride electrolyte, but can be used with lower concentrations such as 1 M potassium chloride. In seawater or chlorinated potable water they are usually directly immersed with no separate electrolyte. As noted above, changing the electrolyte concentration changes the electrode potential. Silver chloride is slightly soluble in strong potassium chloride solutions, so it is sometimes recommended that the potassium chloride be saturated with silver chloride.
