= Bragg-Paul Pulsator =

Medical ventilator

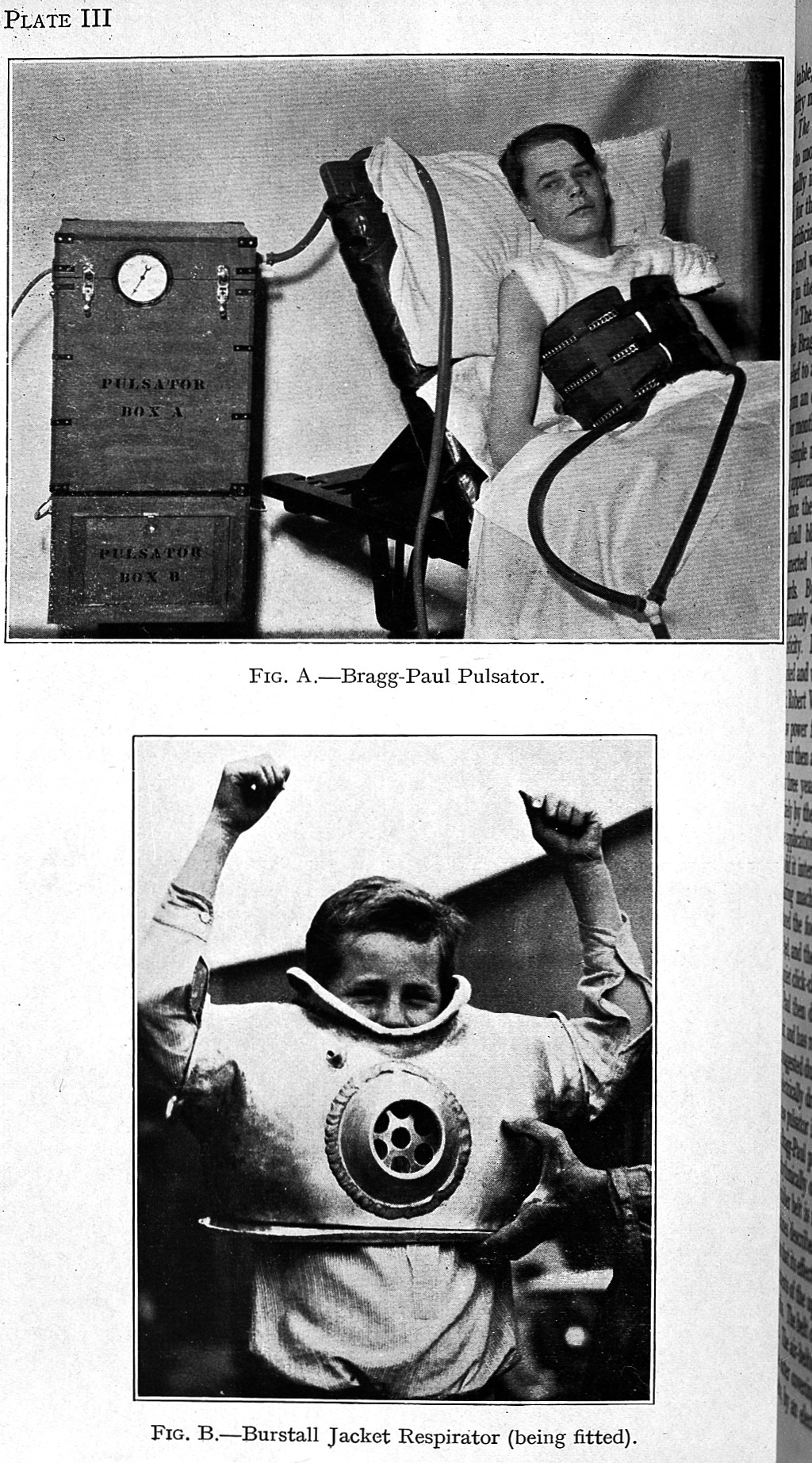

Bragg-Paul Pulsator

The Bragg-Paul Pulsator, also known as the Bragg-Paul respirator, was a non-invasive medical ventilator invented by William Henry Bragg and designed by Robert W. Paul in 1933 for patients unable to breathe for themselves due to illness.

It was the first 'Intermittent Abdominal Pressure Ventilator' (IAPV).

== Design ==
The Pulsator applied pressure externally upon the body to force exhalation, and the natural elasticity of the chest and the weight of the internal organs upon the diaphragm produced inhalation when that external pressure was removed. This method is now described as 'intermittent abdominal pressure ventilation', in contrast to negative pressure ventilators, commonly called 'iron lungs', that force inhalation and rely on chest elasticity to produce exhalation.

Bragg came up with the idea for the machine to help a friend suffering from muscular dystrophy. His first version comprised a football bladder strapped to the patient's chest connected to a second football bladder sandwiched between two boards hinged together. Squeezing of the second bladder inflated the first, which compressed the chest and forced exhalation from the lungs. The first version built by scientific instrument maker R W Paul was water-powered - it was used for 17 hours per day for 3 years, except when the water supply froze one hard winter. It consumed about 700 gallons (3 cubic metres) of water per day.

The commercial Pulsator designed by Paul consisted of a belt worn around the patient's abdomen and lower thorax that was rhythmically filled with air from bellows being driven electrically. A gauge indicated the pressure being applied to the chest, and the rate of compression could be modified to suit the patient's breathing. An escape-valve on the bellows controlled the pressure being applied. The 1934 model could be driven by hand, water or electric power, one case having used water power for a year. Following an analysis of the ventilation induced by the 1934 model, physiologist Phyllis Tookey Kerridge recommended some modifications that greatly improved the efficiency and usability of the belt. A quieter and more portable model was produced in 1937.

The advantages of the design were its ease of transportation and use, it did not impede orthopaedic and nursing care, and could prevent lung collapse in some cases. Disadvantages were that inhalation depended upon elastic recoil of the chest and upon gravity pulling the diaphragm back down, and so breathing could be shallow and the patient could not lie down; attention was required in its use, and the action gave the patient more discomfort compared with cabinet (iron lung) respirators.

It was built in Britain by Siebe Gorman & Company Ltd.

== Use ==
The Pulsator was used predominantly for the treatment of diphtheria and anterior poliomyelitis-related respiratory paralysis. Other conditions treated with some degree of success were drug overdoses, and muscular dystrophy.

The Pulsator and the 'iron lung' where the only respirators available during the severe outbreak of poliomyelitis in the United Kingdom in 1938. By March 1939 there were 43 Pulsators known to be in use in the British Isles, more common than the 'iron lungs', but already vastly outnumbered by the new Both respirators, which had been selected by a Medical Research Council committee investigating the shortage of equipment needed to cope with the polio epidemic. The Both was chosen over the equally effective Bragg-Paul when Lord Nuffield offered to give the both to hospitals for free. This choice probably curtailed the further development of the Pulsator.

In 1950 the Pulsator was still in use in Great Britain, Ireland and Portugal, still being the preferred ventilator for polio cases in Ireland.

An early documented use of the Pulsator was at the Cork Street Fever Hospital, Dublin. From 1935 to 1938 all cases of post-diphtheria respiratory paralysis were treated with the Pulsator, only one of which died due to respiratory failure (when the machine broke down).

Use of the Pulsator spread in the late 1950s due to its convenience and portability for chronically ill patients.

== Legacy ==
The Pulsator provided life-saving treatment for many people in the early days of artificial ventilation. When the only alternative was the 'iron lung', the much less intrusive treatment of the Pulsator allowed for a more normal life for its patients.

As the first 'Intermittent Abdominal Pressure Ventilator', the Pulsator was the forerunner of various newer apparatuses, in particular the 'Pneumobelt' which subsequently became a generic name for the genre. A 1991 study concluded that IAPV was effective for the long-term daytime treatment of respiratory insufficiency and could avoid the need for tracheostomy. While the less-severely ill patients preferred IPPV (intermittent positive pressure ventilation), IAPV was found to be best for severe cases, and was the preferred type of mechanical assistance in the seated position. However it should not be used for 24 hours a day, and its effectiveness for some patients could decline after years of use.

Although considered obsolete by 2014, superseded by newer types of ventilators, Pneumobelts were still manufactured at least until 2008.

== See also ==
- Artificial ventilation
- Mechanical ventilation
