= Antimony electrode =

PH electrode

The antimony electrode has been investigated for its ability to function as a pH electrode. The electrode is made of elemental antimony. The electrochemical process can be formulated as

$$\ce{Sb2O3 + 6 H+ + 6 e-  <=> 2Sb + 3 H2O}$$

The oxide, Sb_{2}O_{3}, is present on the surface of the electrode. Although this electrode does not give measurements of high accuracy, its rapid response, simplicity and rugged construction make it useful for continuous industrial pH monitoring. It can be used at elevated temperatures. In an unusual application, an antimony electrode was used to measure pH inside the human stomach. The simplicity of construction meant that the electrode could be made small enough to be swallowed. Thin copper wires were attached to the electrode and one terminal on a pH meter. The subject's foot was placed in a saline solution. A calomel reference electrode was also placed in this solution and was connected to the other terminal on the meter. Antimony electrodes continue to be used for in vivo measurements. The use of antimony-based electrodes for analytical determinations has been reviewed.

Antimony electrodes are available commercially. They can be employed with solutions containing hydrofluoric acid for which the glass electrode cannot be used because of the reaction of glass with solutions containing hydrogen fluoride.
