= The Hand & Flowers =

Gastropub

Coordinates: 51.56981°N 0.78334°W

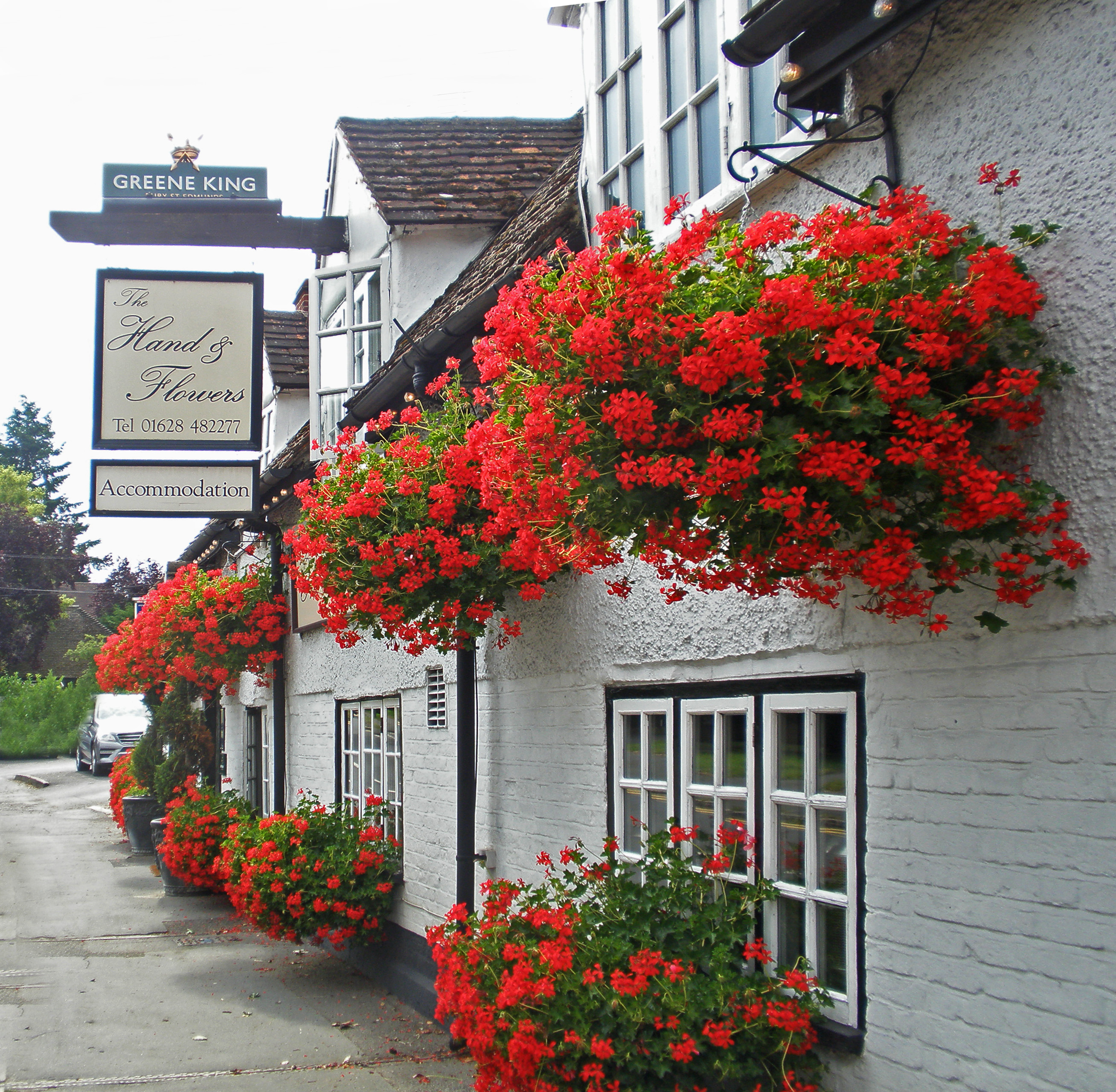
- Interactive map of The Hand & Flowers

Restaurant information
- Established: 2005; 21 years ago
- Owner: Tom Kerridge
- Head chef: Tom De Keyser
- Food type: British/French
- Dress code: Casual
- Rating: (Michelin Guide); AA Rosettes
- Location: 126 West Street, Marlow, SL7 2BP, United Kingdom
- Reservations: Yes
- Website: Official website

The Hand & Flowers is a gastropub in Marlow, Buckinghamshire, England that opened in 2005. Owned and operated by Tom Kerridge and his wife Beth Cullen-Kerridge, it gained its first Michelin star within a year of opening and a second in the 2012 list, making it the first pub to hold two Michelin stars. It was named the AA Restaurant of the Year for 2011–12.

== Description ==
The pub was created in 2005 by chef Tom Kerridge and his wife Beth, who runs the front of house. Located in Marlow, Buckinghamshire on West Street, only a few doors down from where Mary Shelley wrote Frankenstein. The pub gained its first Michelin star, and three AA Rosettes in under a year.

At the AA Restaurant and Hotel Awards 2011–12 the pub was named the AA Restaurant of the Year for England. The pub was upgraded to two Michelin stars in the 2012 list, the first time a pub has ever held two stars. Michelin Guide editor Rebecca Burr said of The Hand & Flowers, "Tom’s cooking has risen to new heights. His dishes are sophisticated yet familiar and are a perfect match for the relaxed surroundings of his charming pub."

After Kerridge appeared on the BBC television show the Great British Menu, he added his two winning dishes to the menu at The Hand & Flowers. Vegetarian dishes are usually created ad hoc, and rely on the improvisation of the chefs.

The Hand & Flowers also has four suites for rent in two refurbished cottages. Each suite has a separate entrance, and the suites are each decorated around a different centrepiece such as a copper bath or private terrace and hot tub.

== 2018 accident ==
On 24 October 2018, Andy Lewis, a chef employed by The Hand & Flowers, was severely injured after a pressurized stock boiler exploded, covering him in two hundred liters of boiling stock. Speaking exclusively to The Staff Canteen, Andy explained the extent of his injuries, his recovery, and the effects it had on his mental health. In the interview, Lewis reiterated that despite being involved in the accident, it hadn't hindered his time at the restaurant, whilst crediting Kerridge for supporting him and his family through his recovery. Lewis spent 7 months recovering from the injuries. After returning back to the restaurant, he later left The Hand & Flowers to take up a head chef position at the Sir Charles Napier in Oxfordshire.
