= Reversible hydrogen electrode =

Reference electrode whose potential depends on pH

A reversible hydrogen electrode (RHE) is a reference electrode, more specifically a subtype of the standard hydrogen electrodes, for electrochemical processes. Unlike the standard hydrogen electrode, its measured potential does change with the pH, so it can be directly used in the electrolyte.

The name refers to the fact that the electrode is directly immersed in the actual electrolyte solution and not separated by a salt bridge. The hydrogen ion concentration is therefore not 1 mol/L, or 1 mol/kg, but corresponds to that of the electrolyte solution. In this way, it is possible to achieve a stable potential with a changing pH value. The potential of the RHE correlates to the pH value:

$$E = 0.000 - 0.059\times\mathrm{pH}$$

In general, for a hydrogen electrode in which the reduction of the hydronium ions (H_{3}O^{+}) occurs:

$$\ce{{2H3O+} + {2e^-} <=> {H2} + {2H2O}}$$

or, more often commonly written simply with H^{+} denoting H_{3}O^{+}:

$$\ce{{2H+} + {2e^-} <=> {H2}}$$

with,

$$K = \frac {p{\ce{H2}}} {\ce{(aH+)^2}}$$

the equilibrium potential E depends on the hydrogen pressure pH_{2} and the activity aH^{+} as follows:

$$E = E^{\ominus} - \frac{RT}{zF} \ln K$$

$$E = E^{\ominus} - \frac{RT}{2F} \ln \frac {p{\ce{H2}}} {\ce{(aH+)^2}}$$

$$E = E^{\ominus} - \frac{RT}{F} \left( \tfrac12\ln p{\ce{H2}} - \ln \ce{(aH+)} \right)$$

$$E = E^{\ominus} + \frac{RT}{F} \left( \ln a\ce{H+} - \tfrac12\ln p\ce{H2} \right)$$

Here, $E^{\ominus}$ is the standard reduction potential (by convention equal to zero), R is the universal gas constant, T the absolute temperature, and F is the Faraday constant.

== Principle ==
The reversible hydrogen electrode is a fairly practical and reproducible electrode "standard". The term refers to a hydrogen electrode immersed in the electrolyte solution actually used.

The benefit of that electrode is that no salt bridge is needed:

- There is no contamination of the electrolyte by chlorides or sulfates.
- There are no diffusion potentials at the electrolyte bridge (liquid junction potential). This is important at temperature different to 25 °C.
- Long-time measurements are possible (no electrolyte bridge means no maintenance of the bridge)

== See also ==
- Dynamic hydrogen electrode
- Palladium-hydrogen electrode
