= Zygmunt Klemensiewicz =

Polish physicist and physical chemist (1886–1963)

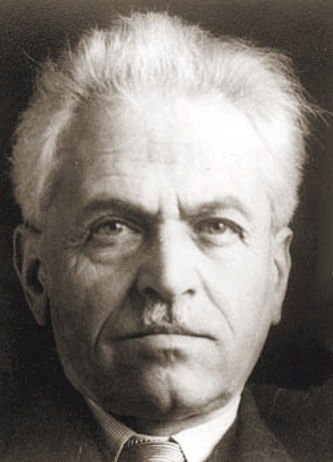
- Klemensiewicz, before 1938
- Born: 23 April 1886; Kraków, Austria-Hungary
- Died: 25 March 1963 (aged 76); Gliwice, Poland
- Education: University of Lviv
- Known for: glass electrode new methods of salvarsan synthesis
- Scientific career
- Fields: Physics; Physical chemistry
- Workplaces: Lwów Polytechnic; Pasteur Institute; Silesian University of Technology
- Thesis: Chlorek antymonowy jako rozczynnik jonizujący (1908)

Zygmunt Aleksander Klemensiewicz (Polish: [klɛmɛnˈɕɛvit͡ʂ]; 24 April 1886 – 25 March 1963) was a Polish physicist and physical chemist. A graduate of the University of Lviv, he worked as professor at the Lviv Polytechnic and the Silesian University of Technology. Early in his career (working for Fritz Haber in Karlsruhe), he made a pioneering contribution to the development of the glass electrode.

== Life and career ==
Klemensiewicz was born on 24 April 1886 in Kraków, then part of the Kingdom of Galicia and Lodomeria, a constituent part of Austria-Hungary. His father, Robert, was a teacher of history and geography and a headmaster of a secondary school; his mother, Maria, was a translator from Scandinavian languages into Polish. From 1892 the family lived in Lwów. Already as a schoolchild, Klemensiewicz stood out for exceptional talent for learning. He finished the Hetman Stanisław Żółkiewski Gymnasium in 1902.

In the years 1904–1908, he studied chemistry, physics, and mathematics at the Lwów University, where his professors included Wacław Sierpiński, Marian Smoluchowski, Stanisław Tołłoczko, Kazimierz Twardowski and Bronisław Radziszewski. In 1908, Klemensiewicz earned his doctorate under Tołłoczko based on his dissertation entitled Chlorek antymonowy jako rozczynnik jonizujący (Antimony Chloride as an Ionizing Reagent).

In the years 1908–1909, under a scholarship, he worked with Nobel Prize laureate Fritz Haber at the Technische Hochschule in Karlsruhe (now the Karlsruhe Institute of Technology), on the potential of the glass electrode constructing the so-called Klemensiewicz electrode. In 1912, he obtained his habilitation degree at Lwów. In the years 1913–1914, he worked with Marie Skłodowska-Curie in Paris, i.a., on the electrochemical properties of radium-B and thorium-B. After the outbreak of World War I, he continued working in Paris at the Pasteur Institute under Jan Kazimierz Danysz and developed a new technology for synthesizing salvarsan. In 1920–1940, he was an ordinary professor of physics and electronics at the Lwów Polytechnic.

In years 1940, he was deported to Kazakhstan. He volunteered to enlist in Gen. Władysław Anders' Polish Army and made his way through Iran and Egypt to Great Britain. During his stay in Britain, Klemensiewicz actively participated in organizing Polish higher education in exile. In 1944, he was appointed by the Polish government-in-exile as chairman of the Council of Academic Technical Schools. He also helped establish the Polish Polytechnic in London, later transformed into the Polish University College. He taught physics there and headed the institution from 1947 to 1951.

From 1956, he was a professor at the Silesian University of Technology in Gliwice.

Klemensiewicz was also an accomplished mountaineer and skier, author of the first Polish-language manual on mountain climbing (1913), co-founder and vice-president (1922–1939) of Polish Skiing Association (Polish: Polski Związek Narciarski). He died, aged 76, in Gliwice and was buried in his hometown of Kraków.

== See also ==
- List of Polish physicists
- Polish Physical Society
