= VAT's the Problem =

British VAT reduction campaign

#VAT's The Problem
- Formation: June 1, 2026; 5 months ago
- Founder: Tom Kerridge
- Website: https://www.vatstheproblem.co.uk/

#VAT's the Problem is a British campaign founded in 2026 by Tom Kerridge that aims to reduce the value-added tax (VAT) for the hospitality sector from 20% to 10% by achieving 1,000,000 signatures on its petition to do so. It is supported by over 800 hospitality businesses in the UK.

== Background ==
VAT was implemented in the UK from 1 April 1973, with the hospitality industry subject to the standard rate, which since January 2011 has been 20%, bar temporary reductions from May 2020 to March 2022 due to the COVID-19 pandemic. In February 2026, Andy Burnham, then Mayor of Manchester, now Prime Minister, said he would argue for the hospitality VAT rate to be reduced to 10%.

== History ==
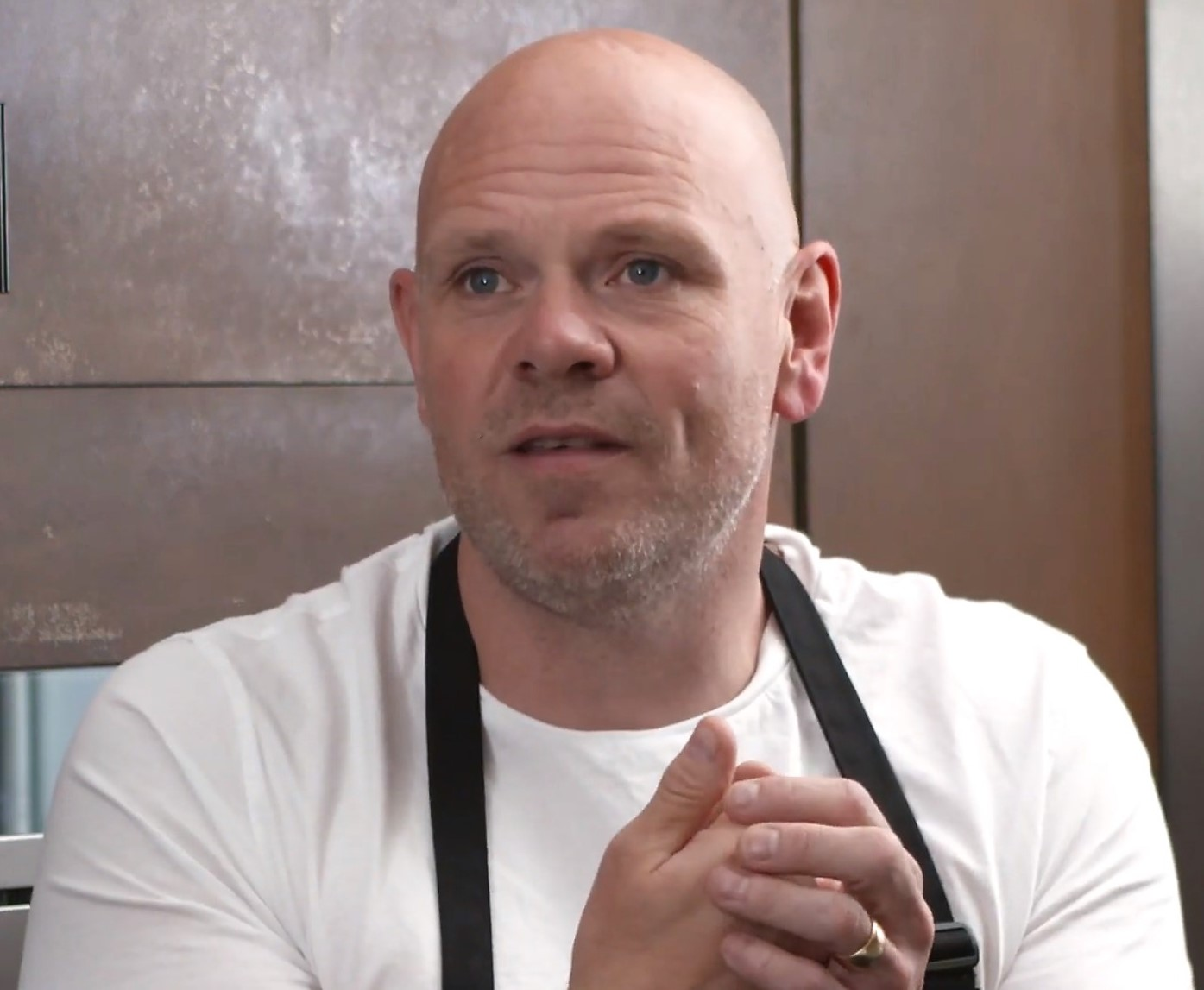
Tom Kerridge, the founder of #VAT's the Problem, in 2020

On 1 June 2026, #VAT's the Problem launched, encouraging people to sign an open letter to reduce VAT on the hospitality sector to 10%, with the aim of reaching 1,000,000 signatures. Celebrity chef Tom Kerridge launched the campaign. The campaign was signed by over 100,000 people in its first three days. On 8 June 2026, Alyn Smith lodged a motion in Scottish Parliament supporting the campaign. At PMQs on 11 July 2026, Green MP Hannah Spencer asked then Prime Minister Keir Starmer if he would support the campaign, he refused, pointing to the Summer Savings Programme, which temporarily reduced VAT from 20% to 5% for children's menu food. The campaign has garnered support from over 800 hospitality venues, alongside celebrity chefs such as Heston Blumenthal and Nathan Outlaw.

== Reception ==
Tax lawyer Dan Neidle, writing for The Times, called the proposed tax cut "incredibly stupid", arguing that the move would benefit large corporations far more than it would benefit small business, as 45% of hospitality business do not pay VAT.

=== Supporters ===
==== Chefs ====
- Tom Kerridge
- Heston Blumenthal
- Clare Smyth
- Angela Hartnett
- Andi Oliver
- Jason Atherton
- Nathan Outlaw
- Paul Ainsworth

==== Restaurants and food groups ====
- PizzaExpress
- Wagamama
- Wetherspoons
- Greene King
- Mitchells & Butlers
