= Royal Ear Hospital =

- University College London Hospitals NHS Foundation Trust
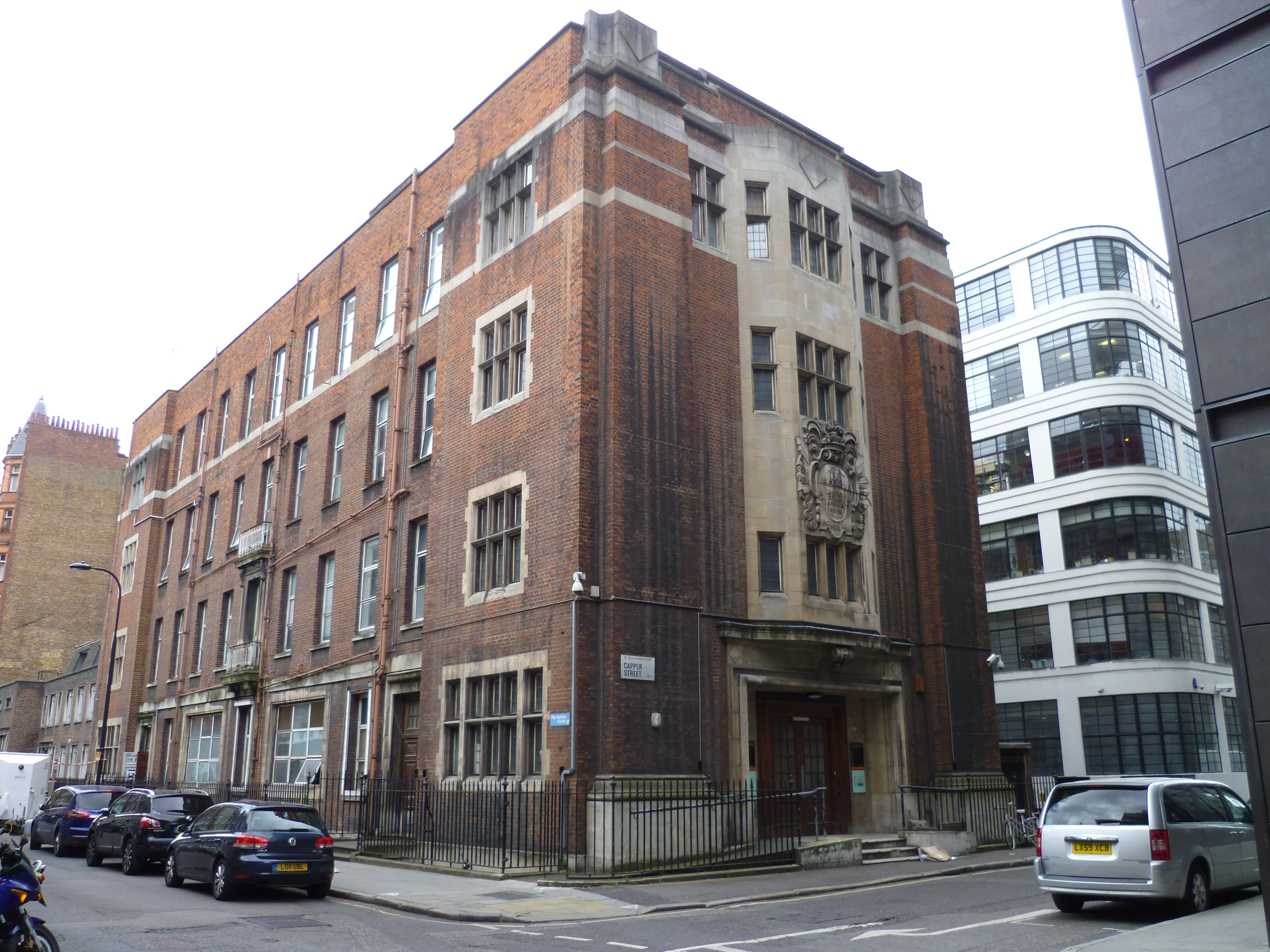
- The Royal Ear Hospital building in 2015.

- Location within Westminster

Geography
- Location: Capper Street, London, England, United Kingdom
- Coordinates: 51.5226°N 0.1375°W

Organisation
- Care system: NHS England

History
- Founded: 1816
- Closed: 1997

Links
- Lists: Hospitals in England

Royal Ear Hospital was a hospital in Capper Street, London. It was managed by the University College London Hospitals NHS Foundation Trust.

== History ==
The hospital was founded by John Curtis, a naval surgeon, at Carlisle Street in 1816. It moved to Dean Street in Soho shortly thereafter and then to Frith Street in 1876 and then back to Dean Street in 1904. It moved to its final home at 21 Capper Street, London in 1927 after money and land was donated by the barrister and philatelist, Sir Geoffrey Duveen (1883–1975) in memory of his parents.

After services transferred to the Royal National Throat, Nose and Ear Hospital in about 1997, the building ceased to be used for medical purposes and was then vacant for some time. In 2012, the building was occupied by the Bartlett School of Architecture. There are now plans to demolish the building and replace it with a specialist ear, nose, throat and mouth unit.
