= Beth Cullen-Kerridge =

English sculptor

Beth Cullen-Kerridge (born 1970) is an English sculptor.

Cullen-Kerridge was born in Stoke-on-Trent to Judith Vincent, a businesswoman, and James Cullen, a painter. She attended John Moores University and the Royal College of Art. In 1994, she became the first artist to be presented with the commission for the Napoleon Garden Sculpture exhibition in Holland Park. Her work was subsequently shown in two of the London Parks.

Her work has been shown in exhibitions England including specifically-made sculptures for her home town of Stoke on Trent. She has worked as an assistant in foundries producing works for Eduardo Paolozzi, Elisabeth Frink, and Sir Anthony Caro.

In 2004 Cullen-Kerridge moved to Norfolk to work on property renovation. A year later she moved to Marlow in Buckinghamshire to develop and open a gastropub, The Hand and Flowers with her husband, chef Tom Kerridge, with whom she has one son, Acey (born 2015). They were able to purchase the pub with the help of money she had received for a sculpture commission for a roundabout in Stoke. She subsequently gave up producing sculpture for a number of years while she developed the business.

Cullen-Kerridge travelled to Carrara in 2010, to study marble carving with artisans there.

She had an exhibition at Hoxton Arches, Hoxton, East London, in 2014. Works included a formal shirt on a crucifix called "Hung out to Dry".

Her sculptures also include a shirt torso with a shark fin protruding from the back. She exhibited at Gallery Different in Percy Street, London in October 2015.
