= William Henry Kerridge =

William Henry Kerridge (1881–1940) was a British musician born in Eastbourne to Daniel Kerridge and Elizabeth Ann Kerridge. Kerridge was baptized in 1882 at St Andrew's Church in Farnham. He had seven siblings: William Job Kerridge, Matilda Catherine Ramsay (born Kerridge), and five others. He was married in 1924 to Dr. Phyllis Margaret Tookey Kerridge (1902–1940), a pioneering medical physiologist, and had one son.

Kerridge was an organist at St. Andrew's Church, the same one he was baptized in, until 1903. He was an assistant music master at Winchester College and a pianist for the Beecham Opera Company. In 1907 he received a bachelor's degree in music from the University of Cambridge. a From 1914 to 1918, he was the organist at the American Church at Paris. After World War I, he conducted several choral societies, and, for a time, he was head of music at Chelsea Polytechnic. He was a friend of Walford Davies. Kerridge was also a secretary of the British Music Society and principal of the Education Department of the Gramophone Company. He was very interested in Soviet Russia and wrote about it for the Musical Times.

In 1933, he was involved with a project sponsored by the British Drama League to produce recordings of British dialects.

From about 1935, he was a peripatetic examiner for Trinity College of Music, visiting Canada, the United States, South America, New Zealand, and Tahiti.

After his death in 1940 in New York, the Musical Times' Obituarist wrote: "A very versatile man, his music being part of a singularly wide culture and knowledge. He had a varied and rather unsettled career as organist, pianist, teacher, lecturer, and conductor, and He was an accomplished linguist and a great traveler, happiest when he could be musically occupied in faraway places – such as Tahiti where he gave a broadcast."

== Works ==
“The Union of Soviet Composers”, The Musical Times, Vol. 75, No. 1102 (Dec. 1934), pp. 1073–1075

“Soviet Music in London”, The Musical Times, Vol. 76, No. 1108 (Jun. 1935), pp. 545–546

“Musicians in Soviet Russia”, The Musical Times, Vol. 76, No. 1110 (Aug. 1935), pp. 696–698

“Conditions in Russia, The Musical Times, Vol. 76, No. 1113 (Nov. 1935), p. 1020

Letter 1: "Religion and Morals in Soviet Russia", The Scotsman – Saturday 15 February 1936

Letter 2: "Religion and Morals in Soviet Russia", The Scotsman – Friday 28 February 1936

Letter 3: "Religion and Morals in Soviet Russia", The Scotsman – Wednesday 11 March 1936

He was the translator of:

Kautsky, Karl, 1854–1938, Terrorism and communism: a contribution to the natural history of revolution.[1920] London: G. Allen & Unwin Ltd.

Wellesz, Egon, 1885–1974, Arnold Schönberg, 1925, London : Dent
