= Tom Kerridge =

British chef (born 1973)

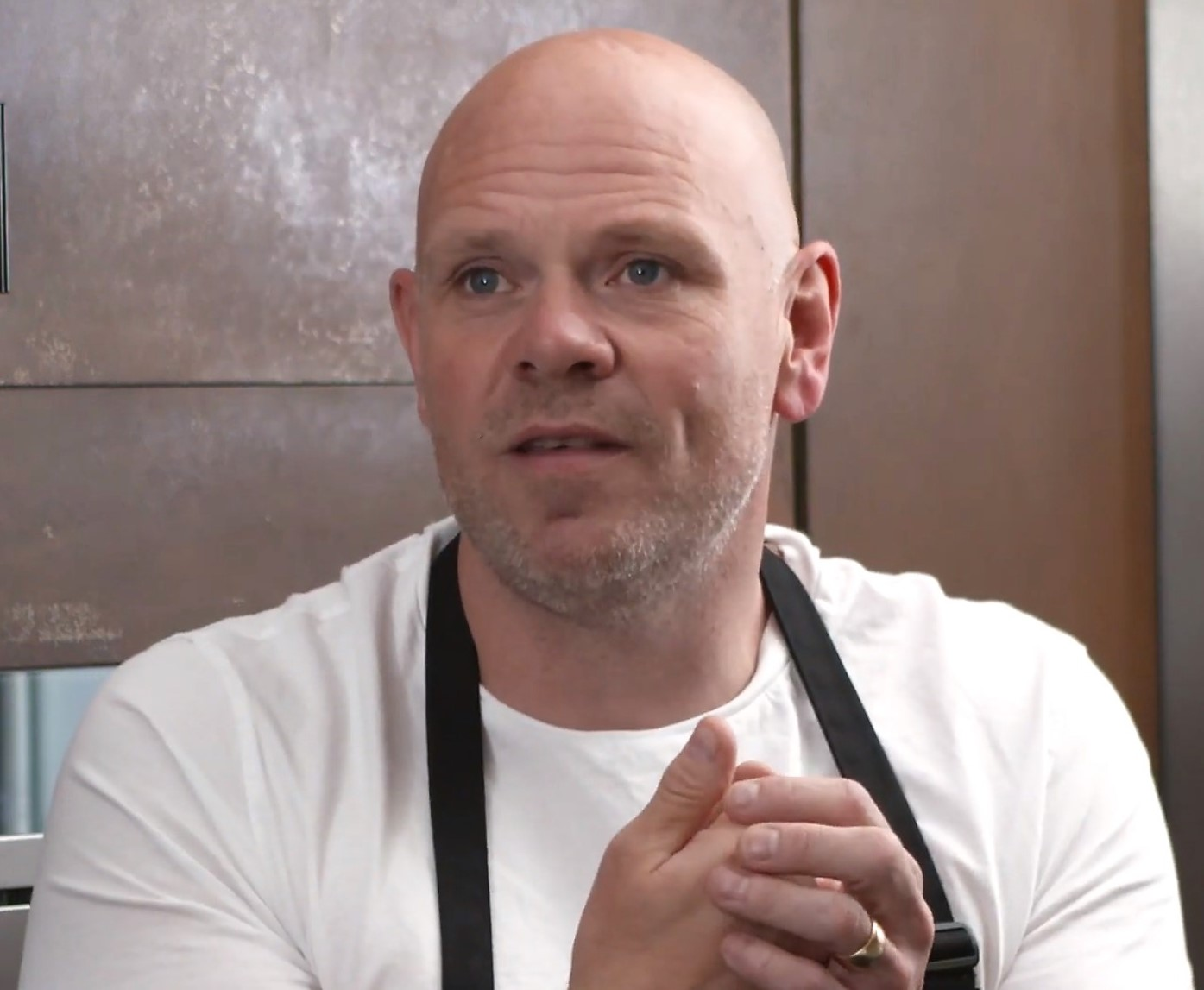
- Kerridge speaks to the British Library in 2020
- Born: Thomas Kerridge; 27 July 1973 (age 53); Salisbury, England
- Spouse: Beth Cullen-Kerridge (m. 2000)
- Children: 1
- Culinary career
- Cooking style: British/French
- Ratings
- Michelin stars AA Rosettes
- Current restaurant
- The Hand and Flowers; The Coach; The Butcher's Tap; Kerridge’s Bar & Grill
- Previous restaurant
- Adlards
- Television shows
- Great British Menu; Saturday Kitchen; Proper Pub Food; Spring Kitchen with Tom Kerridge; Food and Drink; Bake Off: Crème de la Crème; Tom Kerridge: Lose Weight For Good; Top of the Shop
- Website: tomkerridge.com

Thomas Kerridge (born 27 July 1973) is a British chef. He has worked at and owned a variety of British restaurants, including two with Michelin stars.

Kerridge has appeared on the Great British Menu, MasterChef, and Saturday Kitchen. He presented the BBC shows How to Lose Weight For Good, Top of the Shop, Bake Off: Crème de la Crème and currently presents Food and Drink since 2015.

== Early life ==
Kerridge is the elder of two brothers. His parents divorced when he was 11. His mother held a number of jobs while moving the single-parent family around several housing estates in Gloucester. He attended Saintbridge Secondary School in the city, and began cooking for himself and his younger brother after school while his mother was at work. Kerridge enjoyed riding his bike and visiting Westonbirt Arboretum.

He attended a youth theatre for three weeks when he was spotted and cast in the 1991 Christmas special of the BBC1 television show Miss Marple: They Do It with Mirrors. A number of other small television roles followed, but at the age of 18 he decided to pursue cooking instead of an acting career. Kerridge found Marco Pierre White's White Heat cookbook inspiring, and states that it encouraged him to pursue a career as a chef by attending catering college in Cheltenham.

== Career ==
Kerridge's first role in a professional kitchen was as a commis chef at Calcot Manor in Tetbury in 1991. Kerridge went to work under Philip Britten at the Capital Hotel, Knightsbridge. This was followed with three years at the Stephen Bull restaurant in Marylebone. He moved around several restaurants as a chef de partie before joining Rhodes in the Square as sous chef under Gary Rhodes in 1999.

He spent a further two years as sous chef at Odettes in London. In 2001, he became head chef for the first time, at Bellamys Dining Room, and then at Great Fosters in Surrey. He moved back to London to become senior sous chef at Monsieur Max until 2003, before moving to Adlards in Norwich as head chef.

In 2005 he opened his own gastropub, The Hand & Flowers, which gained a Michelin star in 2006 and a second Michelin star in 2012, becoming the first pub ever to hold two Michelin stars. The Hand & Flowers was named the UK's top gastropub for the third consecutive year at the Budweiser Budvar Top 50 Gastropubs Awards in January 2014. Kerridge describes himself as "not a Michelin-star kind of guy", which influenced his choice to open a gastropub.

On 7 November 2012, Kerridge was among a number of chefs who joined in the criticism of a customer at his associate Claude Bosi's restaurant Hibiscus. James Isherwood had written on his blog Dining With James that he had not enjoyed his starter, leading Bosi and fellow Michelin star chef Sat Bains to abuse him on Twitter.

In 2017, Kerridge launched Pub in the Park in Marlow and repeated the festival in 2018 in Marlow, Bath, Tunbridge Wells and Knutsford. That same year, Kerridge's Marlow pub, The Coach was awarded its first Michelin Star. In September 2018 Kerridge opened Kerridge’s Bar & Grill, his first London restaurant at the Corinthia Hotel in Westminster. He opened The Bull & Bear at Manchester's Stock Exchange Hotel in November 2019. It was owned by former footballers Gary Neville and Ryan Giggs, and hotelier Winston Zahra. The restaurant closed on 31 December 2022.

In January 2021, Kerridge announced that he was teaming up with British Airways to create a new range of short haul economy food. He had previously worked with British Airways in 2019 to design new long-haul menus.

In 2026, Kerridge launched #VAT's The Problem, a campaign that aims to halve the VAT on hospitality venues in the UK.

=== Television work ===
Kerridge has appeared on television in series five and six of the Great British Menu, supplying main courses to the final banquet on both occasions, and has subsequently appeared as a judge on the programme every year since competing and has also appeared on Saturday Kitchen.

In February 2013, he appeared as guest chef on the BBC programme Food and Drink. He became the co-presenter of the show in 2015.

In 2013 he presented the BBC Two food programme Tom Kerridge's Proper Pub Food and then in spring 2014, he hosted Spring Kitchen with Tom Kerridge, aired in a daytime viewing slot on BBC One.

In 2016, Kerridge presented Bake Off: Crème de la Crème for BBC Two. He was replaced by Angus Deayton for the second series in 2017. Kerridge co-presented the 2016 BBC Two series The Food Detectives with Sean Fletcher and Alice Roberts. In 2017 he co-presented The Best of British Takeaways with Cherry Healey on BBC Two. In 2017, he presented Tom Kerridge: Lose Weight For Good for BBC Two. In January 2019 he presented a BBC Two food programme called Tom Kerridge's Fresh Start.

On 19 September 2019, Kerridge's 10-part series called Tom Kerridge's American Feast, premiered on Food Network UK, in which Kerridge traveled on a culinary road trip across America.

In January 2020, Kerridge's 6-part TV series called Lose Weight and Get Fit with Tom Kerridge debuted on BBC2. A hardback book of the same name was released to accompany the series.

On 30 July 2020, Kerridge's 12-part TV series called Tom Kerridge Barbecues premiered on Food Network UK.

== Andy Lewis accident ==
On 24 October 2018, Andy Lewis, a chef employed by The Hand & Flowers, was severely injured after a pressurised stock boiler exploded, covering him in 200 L (44 imp gal; 53 US gal) of boiling stock.

Speaking to the website the Staff Canteen, Lewis explained the extent of his injuries, his recovery, and the effects it had on his mental and physical health. In the interview, Lewis said that despite being involved in the accident, it had not hindered his time at the restaurant. He also credited Kerridge for supporting him and his family through his recovery.

Lewis spent seven months recovering from the injuries. After returning to the restaurant, he left The Hand & Flowers to take up a head chef position at the Sir Charles Napier Inn near Chinnor in Oxfordshire.

== Awards ==
Kerridge won the AA Chefs' Chef of the Year Award at the AA Hospitality Awards in September 2013. He won GQ's Chef of the Year award at the GQ Men of the Year awards in September 2014. In 2017, Kerridge won the Chef Award at the Catey Awards.

== Personal life ==
Kerridge does not cook often when at home.

Kerridge is a lifelong Manchester United supporter and has a number 7 tattoo in honour of his favourite player, Bryan Robson. Kerridge is also a season-ticket holder of Marlow F.C.

Kerridge is married to the sculptor Beth Cullen-Kerridge; the couple have one child. He told the author Paul Stenning: "My relationship with Beth is fantastic but in our first year living and working together she left me three times! It wasn’t what she was used to doing and for every penny you both own to be invested in the business, and for that to be virtually all you are doing with your time is hard. We had everything in our life in the one room and it was all above the place we were working, where I was putting in a 90 hour a week shift. It becomes a huge pressure on your relationship but it also cements it and makes it very strong. We’ve been through a lot together."

During the 2024 United Kingdom general election campaign, Kerridge was a signatory to a letter to The Times endorsing the Labour Party.

== Restaurants ==
| Restaurant | Location | Rating | Date opened | Date closed | Ref |
|---|---|---|---|---|---|
| The Hand & Flowers | Marlow, Buckinghamshire | 2 Michelin stars | February 2005 | - | |
| The Coach | Marlow, Buckinghamshire | 1 Michelin star | 1 December 2015 | - | |
| The Butcher's Tap | Marlow, Buckinghamshire | | 17 November 2017 | - | |
| Kerridge's Bar & Grill | Corinthia Hotel London, Westminster, London | | 10 September 2018 | - | |
| The Bull & Bear | Stock Exchange Hotel, Manchester | | 15 November 2019 | 31 December 2022 | |
| Kerridge's Fish & Chips | Harrods, London | | 11 June 2021 | 31 August 2025 | |
| The Butcher's Tap & Grill, Chelsea | Chelsea, London | | 5 December 2023 | - | |

Key
| 1 Michelin star | One Michelin star |
| 2 Michelin stars | Two Michelin stars |

== Filmography ==
| Year | Television series | Role | Notes | Ref |
|---|---|---|---|---|
| 2010 & 2011 | Great British Menu | Contestant | 2 Series | |
| 2013 | Tom Kerridge's Proper Pub Food | Host | 6 episodes | |
| 2014 | Spring Kitchen with Tom Kerridge | Host | 14 episodes | |
| 2014 | Tom Kerridge's Best Ever Dishes | Host | 6 episodes | |
| 2016 | The Food Detectives | Co-host | Series 1; 6 episodes | |
| 2016 | Bake Off Creme de la Creme | Host | Series 1; 8 episodes | |
| 2018 | Tom Kerridge's Lose Weight for Good | Host | 6 episodes | |
| 2018 | Top of the Shop with Tom Kerridge | Host | Series 1; 8 episodes | |
| 2019 | Tom Kerridge's American Feast | Host | 10 episodes | |
| 2019 | Tom Kerridge's Fresh Start | Host | 6 episodes | |
| 2020 | Lose Weight and Get Fit with Tom Kerridge | Host | 6 episodes | |
| 2020 | Tom Kerridge Barbecues | Host | 12 episodes | |
| 2020 | Saving Britain's Pubs with Tom Kerridge | Host | 4 episodes | |
| 2022 | Great British Menu | Judge | Series 17 | |
| 2022 | Tom Kerridge’s Sunday Lunch | Host | | |
| 2022 | Food Network series; 6 x episodes & 1 Christmas special | | | |
| 2023 | The Hidden World of Hospitality with Tom Kerridge | Host | 8 episodes | |
| 2024 | Tom Kerridge Cooks Britain | Host | Six-part series | |
| 2024, 2025 | Tom Kerridge: Secrets of The Pub Kitchen | Host | Two series | |
| 2025 | Tom Kerridge Cooks Spain | Host | One series | |
| 2026 | Tom Kerridge Cooks Italy | Host | One series | |

== Published works ==
- Tom Kerridge's Proper Pub Food (17 December 2013) ISBN 9781472903532
- Tom Kerridge’s Best Ever Dishes (23 October 2014) ISBN 9781472909411
- Tom's Table: My Favourite Everyday Recipes (3 December 2015) ISBN 9781472909435
- Tom Kerridge's Dopamine Diet (14 March 2017) ISBN 9781472935410
- Lose Weight for Good (19 March 2019) ISBN 9781472949295
- Lose Weight & Get Fit (14 January 2020) ISBN 9781472962829
- The Hand & Flowers Cookbook (12 January 2021) ISBN 9781472935397
- Tom Kerridge's Outdoor Cooking: The Ultimate Modern Barbecue Bible (27 May 2021) ISBN 9781526641427
- Real Life Recipes (1 September 2022) ISBN 9781472981646
- Pub Kitchen: The Ultimate Modern British Food Bible (14 September 2023) ISBN 9781472981646
- Tom Kerridge Cooks Britain (6 June 2024) ISBN 9781526671936
- The BBQ Book (24 April 2025) ISBN 9781526684899
