= Quinhydrone electrode =

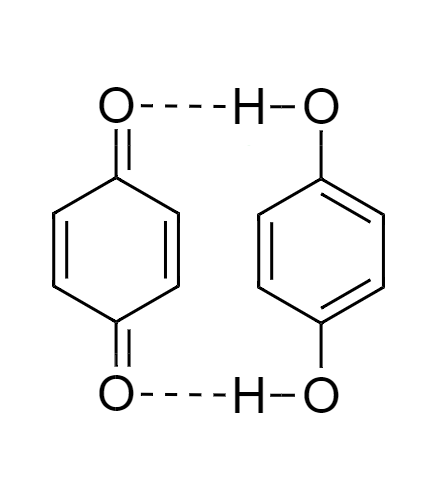
Quinhydrone is produced by hydrogen bonding between ρ-quinone and ρ-hydroquinone

The quinhydrone electrode may be used to measure the hydrogen ion concentration (pH) of a solution containing an acidic substance.

== Principles and operation ==
Quinones form a quinhydrone cocrystal by formation of hydrogen bonding between ρ-quinone and ρ-hydroquinone. An equimolar mixture of ρ-quinones and ρ-hydroquinone in contact with an inert metallic electrode, such as antimony, forms what is known as a quinhydrone electrode. Such devices can be used to measure the pH of solutions. Quinhydrone electrodes provide fast response times and high accuracy. However, it can only measure pH in the range of 1 to 9 and the solution must not contain a strong oxidizing or reducing agent.

A platinum wire electrode is immersed in a saturated aqueous solution of quinhydrone, in which there is the following equilibrium

C_{6}H_{6}O_{2} ⇌ C_{6}H_{4}O_{2} + 2H^{+} +2e^{−}.

The potential difference between the platinum electrode and a reference electrode is dependent on the activity, $a_{H^{+}}$, of hydrogen ions in the solution.

$E= E^0 + \frac{RT}{2F} \ln a_{H^{+}}$ (Nernst equation)

== Limitations ==
The quinhydrone electrode provides an alternative to the most commonly used glass electrode. however, it is not reliable above pH 8 (at 298 K) and cannot be used with solutions that contain a strong oxidizing or reducing agent.
