= Dynamic hydrogen electrode =

A dynamic hydrogen electrode (DHE) is a reference electrode, more specific a subtype of the standard hydrogen electrodes for electrochemical processes by simulating a reversible hydrogen electrode with an approximately 20 to 40 mV more negative potential.

== Principle ==
A separator in a glass tube connects two electrolytes and a small current is enforced between the cathode and anode.

== Applications ==
- In-situ reference electrode for direct methanol fuel cells
- Proton-exchange membrane fuel cells

== See also ==
- Palladium-hydrogen electrode
