= Cell notation =

Shorthand way for expressing a reaction in an electrochemical cell

In electrochemistry, cell notation or cell representation is a shorthand method of expressing a reaction in an electrochemical cell.

In cell notation, the two half-cells are described by writing the formula of each individual chemical species involved in the redox reaction across the cell, with all other common ions and inert substances being ignored. Each species is separated by a vertical bar or comma.

Single vertical lines | are used to represent a phase boundary (or difference in physical state) e.g. Cu^{2+}_{(aq)}|Cu_{(s)}. The phase difference is from solid to aqueous.

A comma is used to separate things that are in the same phase(state), for example Fe^{3+}_{(aq)}, Fe^{2+}_{(aq)}.

The two half-cells are separated by two bars or slashes representing a salt bridge (which generally contains an electrolyte solution such as potassium nitrate or sodium chloride that is left unwritten). It is common practice to represent the anode to the left of the double bar and the cathode to the right, and to put aqueous species closest to the double bar.

== SHE and other electrodes. ==
When the EMF of different metals is measured against the Standard Hydrogen electrode (SHE), the SHE; by convention is on the left of the cell notation regardless of which side is being reduced or oxidised.

The half equation of Hydrogens reduction is

2H^{+}_{(aq)}+2e^{-} → H_{2(g)} EMF = 0.00

However because there is no solid electrode to attach cables to complete the circuit chemists use a platinum electrode which is shows in the notation by a Pt|H_{2(g)}|H^{+}_{(aq)}||Zn^{2+}|Zn_{(s)} EMF = −0.76 V where the electrode is represented on the edges of the notation.

Cell notation may be used to represent other information that is not essential to the reaction but still useful to include. For example, the electrode's species may be marked by a degree symbol. The standard abbreviations for the phases of each species are often included as subscripts, in a manner similar to the notation in chemical equations. Sometimes, the initial concentrations of dissolved species may be written to the right in parentheses (see example below).

Some examples of this notation are:

Zn°|Zn^{2+}||Cl^{−}|AgCl|Ag°

This means that the left electrode (anode) is made of zinc, while the other one (right, cathode) is composed of a silver wire covered by a silver chloride layer which is not soluble. Both of the electrodes are immersed into aqueous media where zinc and chloride ions are present.

Zn°|Zn^{2+}, SO^{2−}_{4}||SO^{2−}_{4},Cu^{2+}|Cu°

This cell is very famous: the Daniell cell. If the electrodes are connected, a spontaneous reaction takes place. Zinc is oxidized, and copper ions are reduced.

Sometimes the state of each species into the cell is written. For example, in the zinc cell (shown above), we can write that zinc, silver and silver chloride are solids, while zinc cation and chloride anion are in aqueous medium. So, the new notation will be:

Zn°_{s}|Zn^{2+}_{aq} || Cl^{−}_{aq}|AgCl_{s}|Ag°_{s}

It is possible to express the ion concentration too. For example, in the Galvanic cell:

Zn°_{s}|Zn^{2+}_{aq} (1 mol/L), SO^{2−}_{4}_{aq} (1 mol/L)||SO^{2−}_{4}_{aq} (1 mol/L)|Cu^{2+}_{aq}(1 mol/L)|Cu°_{s}

In this case, all ions (sulfate, zinc and copper) are in a concentration equal to 1 mol/L.
