= Reference electrode =

Electrode with a stable and accurate electrode potential

Standard hydrogen electrode scheme: 1) Platinized platinum electrode, 2) Hydrogen gas, 3) Acid solution with an activity of H^{+} = 1 mol/L, 4) Hydroseal for prevention of oxygen interference, 5) Reservoir via which the second half-element of the galvanic cell should be attached. The connection can be direct, through a narrow tube to reduce mixing, or through a salt bridge, depending on the other electrode and solution. This creates an ionically conductive path to the working electrode of interest.

A reference electrode is an electrode that has a stable and well-known electrode potential. The overall chemical reaction taking place in a cell is made up of two independent half-reactions, which describe chemical changes at the two electrodes. To focus on the reaction at the working electrode, the reference electrode is standardized with constant (buffered or saturated) concentrations of each participant of the redox reaction.

There are many ways reference electrodes are used. The simplest is when the reference electrode is used as a half-cell to build an electrochemical cell. This allows the potential of the other half cell to be determined. An accurate and practical method to measure an electrode's potential in isolation (absolute electrode potential) has yet to be developed.

== Aqueous reference electrodes ==
Common reference electrodes and potential with respect to the standard hydrogen electrode (SHE):

- Standard hydrogen electrode (SHE) (E = 0.000 V) activity of H^{+} = 1 Molar
- Normal hydrogen electrode (NHE) (E ≈ 0.000 V) concentration H^{+} = 1 Molar
- Reversible hydrogen electrode (RHE) (E = 0.000 V - 0.0591 × pH) at 25 °C
- Saturated calomel electrode (SCE) (E = +0.241 V saturated)
- Copper–copper(II) sulfate electrode (CSE) (E = +0.314 V)
- Silver chloride electrode (E = +0.197 V in saturated KCl)
- Silver chloride electrode (E = +0.210 V in 3.0 mol KCl/kg)
- Silver chloride electrode (E = +0.22249 V in 3.0 mol KCl/L)
- pH-electrode (in case of pH buffered solutions, see buffer solution)
- Palladium-hydrogen electrode
- Dynamic hydrogen electrode (DHE)
- Mercury-mercurous sulfate electrode (MSE) (E = +0.64 V in sat'd K_{2}SO_{4}, E = +0.68 V in 0.5 M H_{2}SO_{4})

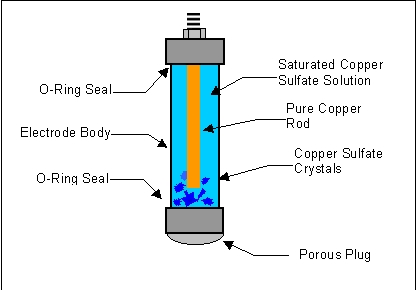
Cu-Cu(II) reference electrode

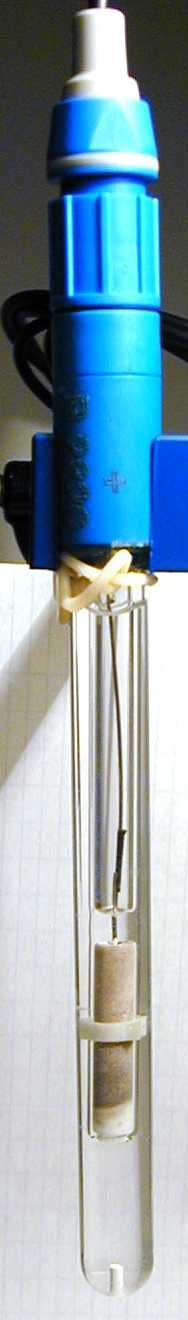
Ag-AgCl reference electrode

== Nonaqueous reference electrodes ==
While it is convenient to compare between solvents to qualitatively compare systems, this is not quantitatively meaningful. Much as pK_{a} are related between solvents, but not the same, so is the case with E°. While the SHE might seem to be a reasonable reference for nonaqueous work as it turns out the platinum is rapidly poisoned by many solvents including acetonitrile causing uncontrolled drifts in potential. Both the SCE and saturated Ag/AgCl are aqueous electrodes based around saturated aqueous solution. While for short periods it may be possible to use such aqueous electrodes as references with nonaqueous solutions the long-term results are not trustworthy. Using aqueous electrodes introduces undefined, variable, and unmeasurable junction potentials to the cell in the form of a liquid-liquid junction as well as different ionic composition between the reference compartment and the rest of the cell. The best argument against using aqueous reference electrodes with nonaqueous systems, as mentioned earlier, is that potentials measured in different solvents are not directly comparable. For instance, the potential for the Fc^{0/+} couple is sensitive to solvent.

Solvent	Formula	E_{1/2} (V) (FeCp_{2}^{0/+} vs SCE, 0.1 M NBu_{4}PF_{6} at 298 K)
Acetonitrile	CH_{3}CN	0.40, 0.382
Dichloromethane	CH_{2}Cl_{2}	0.46, 0.475
Tetrahydrofuran	THF	0.56, 0.547
Dimethylformamide	DMF	0.45, 0.470
Acetone	(CH_{3})_{2}C=O	0.48
Dimethylsulfoxide	DMSO	0.435
Dimethoxyethane	DME	0.51, 0.580

A quasi-reference electrode (QRE) avoids the issues mentioned above. A QRE with ferrocene or another internal standard, such as cobaltocene or decamethylferrocene, referenced back to ferrocene is ideal for nonaqueous work. Since the early 1960s ferrocene has been gaining acceptance as the standard reference for nonaqueous work for a number of reasons, and in 1984, IUPAC recommended ferrocene (0/1+) as a standard redox couple. The preparation of the QRE electrode is simple, allowing for a fresh reference to be prepared with each set of experiments. Since QREs are made fresh, there is also no concern with improper storage or maintenance of the electrode. QREs are also more affordable than other reference electrodes.

To make a quasi-reference electrode (QRE):

1. Insert a piece of silver wire into concentrated HCl then allow the wire to dry on a lint-free cleaning cloth. This forms an insoluble layer of AgCl on the surface of the electrode and gives you an Ag/AgCl wire. Repeat dipping every few months or if the QRE starts to drift.
2. Obtain a Vycor glass frit (4 mm diameter) and glass tubing of similar diameter. Attach Vycor glass frit to the glass tubing with heat shrink Teflon tubing.
3. Rinse then fill the clean glass tube with supporting electrolyte solution and insert Ag/AgCl wire.
4. The ferrocene (0/1+) couple should lie around 400 mV versus this Ag/AgCl QRE in an acetonitrile solution. This potential will vary up to 200 mV with specific undefined conditions, thus adding an internal standard such as ferrocene at some point during the experiment is always necessary.

== Pseudo reference electrodes ==
A pseudo reference electrode is a term that is not well defined and borders on having multiple meanings since pseudo and quasi are often used interchangeably. They are a class of electrodes named pseudo-reference electrodes because they do not maintain a constant potential but vary predictably with conditions. If the conditions are known, the potential can be calculated and the electrode can be used as a reference. Most electrodes work over a limited range of conditions, such as pH or temperature, outside of this range the electrodes behavior becomes unpredictable. The advantage of a pseudo-reference electrode is that the resulting variation is factored into the system allowing researchers to accurately study systems over a wide range of conditions.

Yttria-stabilized zirconia (YSZ) membrane electrodes were developed with a variety of redox couples, e.g., Ni/NiO. Their potential depends on pH. When the pH value is known, these electrodes can be employed as a reference with notable applications at elevated temperatures.

== See also ==
- Auxiliary electrode
- Cyclic voltammetry
- Table of standard electrode potentials
- Working electrode
