= List of electrochemists =

This is a list of electrochemists.

== Electrochemists ==
- Alexander Frumkin
- Faiza Al-Kharafi
- John Alfred Valentine Butler
- Hans Falkenhagen
- Martin Fleischmann
- Alexander Frumkin
- Heinz Gerischer
- Johann Wilhelm Hittorf
- Friedrich Kohlrausch
- Ivan Ostromislensky
- Stanley Pons
- Jean-Michel Savéant
- Julius Tafel
- Nicolae Vasilescu-Karpen
- Max Volmer
- Oliver Patterson Watts

== See also ==
- Electrochemistry
- Faraday Medal (electrochemistry)
- Asian Conference on Electrochemical Power Sources
