= Electrochemical kinetics =

Field of chemistry which studies rates of electrochemical processes

Electrochemical kinetics is the field of electrochemistry that studies the rate of electrochemical processes. This includes the study of how process conditions, such as concentration and electric potential, influence the rate of oxidation and reduction (redox) reactions that occur at the surface of an electrode, as well as an investigation into electrochemical reaction mechanisms. Two accompanying processes are involved in the electrochemical reaction and influence the overall reaction rate:

- electron transfer at the interface between the electrode and the electrolyte
- transport of the redox species from the interior of the solution to the surface of the electrode; the transport can occur by diffusion, convection and migration.

Contributors to this field include Alexander Frumkin, John Alfred Valentine Butler, Max Volmer, and Julius Tafel.

== Butler-Volmer equation ==
An elementary charge transfer step can be described by the Butler–Volmer model proposed by John Alfred Valentine Butler and Max Volmer. The reaction rate is given by the Butler-Volmer equation:

$$j =  j_0  \left\{ \exp \left[ \frac { (1 - \alpha)  z \mathrm{F} } { \mathrm{R} \mathrm{T} } \eta \right] - \exp \left[ - { \frac { \alpha z \mathrm{F} } { \mathrm{R} \mathrm{T} } }  \eta \right] \right\}, \; \eta = \mathrm{E}-\mathrm{E_{eq}}$$

In this equation $j$ is the net current density, $j_0$ is the exchange current density, $\alpha$ is the charge transfer coefficient, $z$ is the number of electrons transferred in the reaction, $F$ is the Faraday constant, $R$ is the molar gas constant, $T$ is the absolute temperature, $\eta$ is the electrode overpotential, $E_{eq}$ is the thermodynamic equilibrium reduction potential and $E$ is the observed value of this potential.

The equation yields a negative current density for a reduction reaction (negative overpotential) and a positive current density for an oxidation reaction (positive overpotential). The sign of the current density has no physical meaning and is defined by an international convention.

== See also ==
- Tafel equation

== Bibliography ==
- Vetter, Klaus J. (1967). Electrochemical kinetics; theoretical aspects. Academic Press. ISBN 9780127202501.
