= Ideal electrode =

In electrochemistry, there are two types of ideal electrode: the ideal polarizable electrode and the ideal non-polarizable electrode. An ideal polarizable electrode is characterized by charge separation at the electrode-electrolyte boundary and is electrically equivalent to a capacitor, while an ideal non-polarizable electrode is characterized by a lack of charge separation and is electrically equivalent to a short circuit.

== Ideal polarizable electrode ==
An ideal polarizable electrode (also ideally polarizable electrode, ideally polarized electrode or IPE) is a hypothetical electrode through which no faradaic current exists between the electrode surface and the electrolyte. Any transient current that may be flowing is considered non-faradaic. This is due to the fact that the electrode reaction is infinitely slow with zero exchange current density, creating an absence of net DC current between the two sides of the electrical double layer. This behaviour makes it electrically equivalent to a capacitor.

The concept of the ideal polarizability was first introduced by F.O. Koenig in 1934.

== Ideal non-polarizable electrode ==
An ideal non-polarizable electrode is a hypothetical electrode through which a faradaic current can freely pass without polarization. Since the electrode reaction is infinitely fast and has an infinite exchange current density, its potential does not change from its equilibrium potential upon application of current. This behaviour makes it electrically equivalent to a short circuit.

== Examples of nearly-ideal electrodes ==
The classical examples of the two nearly ideal types of electrodes, polarizable and non-polarizable, are the mercury droplet electrode in contact with an oxygen-free potassium chloride solution and the silver/silver chloride electrode, respectively.
