= PFV =

PFV may refer to:

- PFV (Rapper)
- Primum Familiae Vini
- Perfective aspect
- Persistent fetal vasculature, a congenital eye anomaly
- Powerhouse fruits and vegetables, roughly speaking a synonym for the so-called 'superfoods'.
- Protein film voltammetry
