= Exchange current density =

Parameter used in electrochemistry

In electrochemistry, exchange current density is a parameter used in the Tafel equation, Butler–Volmer equation and other electrochemical kinetics expressions. The Tafel equation describes the dependence of current for an electrolytic process to overpotential.

The exchange current density is the current in the absence of net electrolysis and at zero overpotential. The exchange current can be thought of as a background current to which the net current observed at various overpotentials is normalized. For a redox reaction written as a reduction at the equilibrium potential, electron transfer processes continue at electrode/solution interface in both directions. The cathodic current is balanced by the anodic current. This ongoing current in both directions is called the exchange current density. When the potential is set more negative than the formal potential, the cathodic current is greater than the anodic current. Written as a reduction, cathodic current is positive. The net current density is the difference between the cathodic and anodic current density.

Exchange current densities reflect intrinsic rates of electron transfer between an analyte and the electrode. Such rates provide insights into the structure and bonding in the analyte and the electrode. For example, the exchange current densities for platinum and mercury electrodes for reduction of protons differ by a factor of 10^{10}, indicative of the excellent catalytic properties of platinum. Owing to this difference, platinum is the preferred electrode material at reducing (cathodic) potentials in aqueous solution.

== Parameters affecting exchange current density ==
The exchange current density depends critically on the nature of the electrode, not only its structure, but also physical parameters such as surface roughness. Of course, factors that change the composition of the electrode, including passivating oxides and adsorbed species on the surface, also influence the electron transfer. The nature of the electroactive species (the analyte) in the solution also critically affects the exchange current densities, both the reduced and oxidized form.

Less important but still relevant are the environment of the solution including the solvent, nature of other electrolytes, and temperature. For the concentration dependence of the exchange current density, the following expression is given for a one-electron reaction:

$$j_0 = F k_0 ( C_{oxy}^{1-\beta} C_{red}^\beta )$$

where:

- $C_{oxy}$: the concentration of the oxidized species
- $C_{red}$: the concentration of the reduced species
- $\beta$: a symmetry factor
- $F$: Faraday constant
- $k_0$: reaction rate constant

== Example values ==
Comparison of exchange current density for proton reduction reaction in 1 mol/kg H_{2}SO_{4}
Electrode material	Exchange current density −log_{10}(A/cm^{2})
Palladium	3.0
Platinum	3.1
Rhodium	3.6
Iridium	3.7
Nickel	5.2
Gold	5.4
Tungsten	5.9
Niobium	6.8
Titanium	8.2
Cadmium	10.8
Manganese	10.9
Lead	12.0
Mercury	12.3

== See also ==
- Partial current
