= Electro-oxidation =

Technique used for wastewater treatment

Electro-oxidation (EO or EOx), also known as anodic oxidation or electrochemical oxidation (EC), is a technique used for wastewater treatment, mainly for industrial effluents, and is a type of advanced oxidation process (AOP). The most general layout comprises two electrodes, operating as anode and cathode, connected to a power source. When an energy input and sufficient supporting electrolyte are provided to the system, strong oxidizing species are formed, which interact with the contaminants and degrade them. The refractory compounds are thus converted into reaction intermediates and, ultimately, into water and CO_{2} by complete mineralization.

Electro-oxidation has recently grown in popularity thanks to its ease of set-up and effectiveness in treating harmful and recalcitrant organic pollutants, which are typically difficult to degrade with conventional wastewater remediation processes. Also, it does not require any external addition of chemicals (contrary to other processes), as the required reactive species are generated at the anode surface.

Electro-oxidation has been applied to treat a wide variety of harmful and non-biodegradable contaminants, including aromatics, pesticides, drugs and dyes. Due to its relatively high operating costs, it is often combined with other technologies, such as biological remediation. Electro-oxidation can additionally be paired with other electrochemical technologies such as electrocoagulation, consecutively or simultaneously, to further reduce operational costs while achieving high degradation standards.

== Apparatus ==
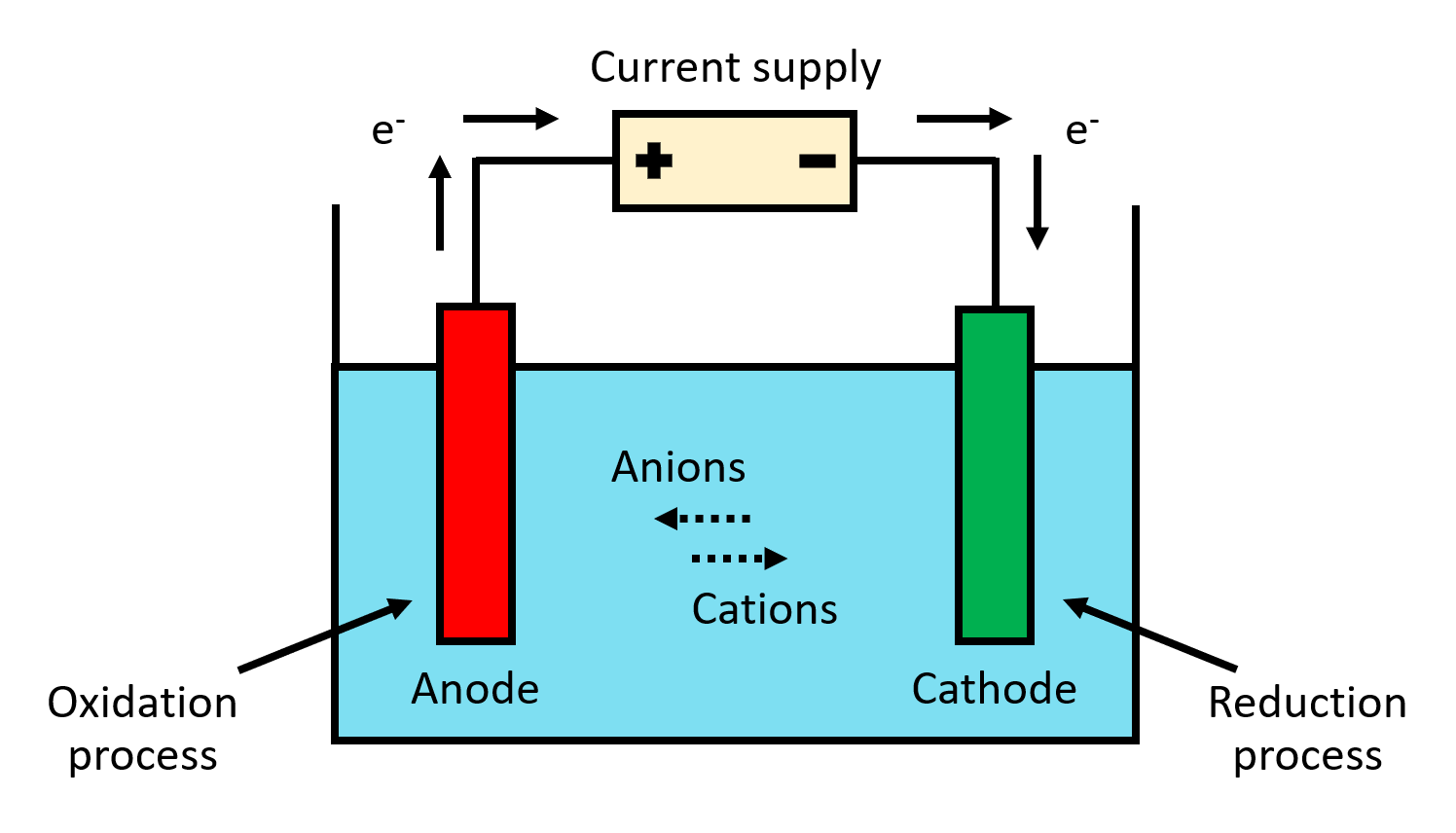
Simple scheme of the apparatus for electro-oxidation process

The set-up for performing an electro-oxidation treatment consists of an electrochemical cell. An external electric potential difference (aka voltage) is applied to the electrodes, resulting in the formation of reactive species, namely hydroxyl radicals, in the proximity of the electrode surface. To assure a reasonable rate of generation of radicals, voltage is adjusted to provide current density of 10-100 mA/cm^{2}. While the cathodes materials are mostly the same in all cases, the anodes can vary greatly according to the application (see § Electrode materials), as the reaction mechanism is strongly influenced by the material selection. Cathodes are mostly made up by stainless steel plates, Platinum mesh or carbon felt electrodes.

Depending on the effluent nature, an increase of the conductivity of the solution may be required: the value of 1000 mS/cm is commonly taken as a threshold. Salts like sodium chloride or sodium sulfate can be added to the solution, acting as electrolytes, thus raising the conductivity. Typical values of salts concentration are in the range of few grams per liter, but the addition has a significant impact on power consumption and can reduce it by up to 30%.

As the main cost associated to electro-oxidation process is the consumption of electricity, its performance are typically assessed through two main parameters, namely current efficiency and specific energy consumption. Current efficiency is generally defined as the charge required for the oxidation of the considered species over the total charged passed during electrolysis. Although some expressions have been proposed to evaluate the instantaneous current efficiency, they have several limitations due to the presence of volatile intermediates or the need for specialized equipment. Thus, it is much easier to define a general current efficiency (GCE), defined as an average of the value of current efficiency along the entire process and formulated as follows:

$GCE=FV\frac{(COD_0-COD_t)}{8It}$

Where COD_{0} and COD_{t} are the chemical oxygen demand (g/dm^{3}) at time 0 and after the treatment time t, F is the Faraday's constant (96'485 C/mol), V is the electrolyte volume (dm^{3}), I is the current (A), t is the treatment time (h) and 8 is the oxygen equivalent mass. Current efficiency is a time dependent parameter and it decreases monotonically with treatment time. Instead, the specific energy consumption measures the energy required to remove a unit of COD from the solution and is typically expressed in kWh/kg_{COD}. It can be calculated according to:

$EC=\frac{E_CIt}{(\Delta COD)_tV_s}$

Where E_{C} is the cell voltage (V), I is the current (A), t is the treatment time (h), (ΔCOD)_{t} is the COD decay at the end of the process (g/L) and V_{s} is the solute volume (L). As the current efficiency may vary significantly depending on the treated solution, one should always find the optimal compromise between current density, treatment time and the resulting specific energy consumption, so to meet the required removal efficiency.

== Working principle ==
=== Direct oxidation ===
When voltage is applied to the electrodes, intermediates of oxygen evolution are formed near the anode, notably hydroxyl radicals. Hydroxyl radicals are known to have one of the highest redox potentials, allowing the degrading many refractory organic compounds. A reaction mechanism has been proposed for the formation of the hydroxyl radical at the anode through oxidation of water:

$\ce{S + H2O -> S[*OH] + H+ + e-}$

Where S represents the generic surface site for adsorption on the electrode surface. Then, the radical species can interact with the contaminants through two different reaction mechanisms, according to the anode material. The surface of "active" anodes strongly interacts with hydroxyl radicals, leading to the production of higher state oxides or superoxides. The higher oxide then acts as a mediator in the selective oxidation of organic pollutants. Due to the radicals being strongly chemisorbed onto the electrode surface, the reactions are limited to the proximity of the anode surface, according to the mechanism:

$\ce{S[*OH] -> SO +H+ + e-}$

$\ce{SO + R -> S + RO}$

Where R is the generic organic compound, while RO is the partially oxidized product.

If the electrode interacts weakly with the radicals, it is qualified as a "non active" anode. Hydroxyl radicals are physisorbed on the electrode surface by means of weak interaction forces and thus available for reaction with contaminants. The organic pollutants are converted to fully oxidized products, such as CO_{2}, and reactions occur in a much less selective way with respect to active anodes:

$\ce{S[*OH] + R -> S + mCO2 + nH2O + H+ + e-}$

Both chemisorbed and physisorbed radicals can undergo the oxygen evolution competitive reaction. For this reason, the distinction between active and non active anodes is made according to their oxygen evolution overpotential. Electrodes with low oxygen overpotential show an active behavior, as in the case of Platinum, graphite or mixed metal oxide electrodes. Conversely, electrodes with high oxygen overpotential will be non-active. Typical examples of nonactive electrodes are lead dioxide or boron-doped diamond electrodes. A higher oxygen overpotential implies a lower yield of the oxygen evolution reaction, thus raising the anodic process efficiency.

=== Mediated oxidation ===
When appropriate oxidizing agents are dissolved into the solution, the electro-oxidation process not only leads to organics oxidation at the electrode surface, but it also promotes the formation of other oxidant species within the solution. Such oxidizing chemicals are not bound to the anode surface and can extend the oxidation process to the entire bulk of the system. Chlorides are the most widespread species for the mediated oxidation. This is due to the chlorides being very common in most wastewater effluents and being easily converted into hypochlorite, according to global reaction:

$\ce{Cl- + H2O -> ClO- + 2H+ + 2e-}$

Although hypochlorite is the main product, chlorine and hypochlorous acid are also formed as reactions intermediate. Such species are strongly reactive with many organic compounds, promoting their mineralization, but they can also produce several unwanted intermediates and final products. These chlorinated by-products sometimes can be even more harmful than the raw effluent contaminants and require additional treatments to be removed. To avoid this issue, sodium sulfate is preferred as electrolyte to sodium chloride, so that chloride ions are not available for the mediated oxidation reaction. Although sulfates can be involved in mediated oxidation as well, electrodes with high oxygen evolution overpotential are required to make it happen.

== Electrode materials ==
=== Carbon and graphite ===
Electrodes based on carbon or graphite are common due to their low cost and high surface area. Also, they are able to promote adsorption of contaminants on their surface while at the same generating the radicals for electro-oxidation. However, they are not suited for working at high potentials, as at such conditions they experience surface corrosion, resulting in reduced efficiency and progressive degradation of the exposed area. In fact, the overpotential for oxygen evolution is quite low for graphite (1.7 V vs SHE).

=== Platinum ===
Platinum electrodes provide good conductivity and they are inert and stable at high potentials. At the same time, the oxygen evolution overpotential is low (1.6 V vs SHE) and comparable to that of graphite. As a result, electro-oxidation with Platinum electrodes usually provides low yield due to partial oxidation of the compounds. The contaminants are converted into stable intermediates, difficult to be broken down, thus reducing current efficiency for complete mineralization.

=== Mixed metal oxides (MMOs) ===
Mixed metal oxides, also known as dimensionally stable anodes, are very popular in electrochemical process industry, because they are very effective in promoting both chlorine and oxygen evolution. In fact, they have been used extensively in the chloralkali industry and for water electrolysis process. In the case of wastewater treatment, they provide low current efficiency, because they favor the competitive reaction of oxygen evolution. Similarly to Platinum electrodes, formation of stable intermediates is favored over complete mineralization of the contaminants, resulting in reduced removal efficiency.

Due to their ability to promote chlorine evolution reaction, dimensionally stable anodes are the most common choice for processes relying on mediated oxidation mechanism, especially in the case of chlorine and hypochlorite production.

=== Lead dioxide ===
Lead dioxide electrodes have long been exploited in industrial applications, as they show high stability, large surface area, good conductivity and they are quite cheap. In addition, lead dioxide has a very high oxygen evolution overpotential (1.9 V vs SHE), which implies a high current efficiency for complete mineralization. Also, lead dioxide electrodes were found to be able to generate ozone, another strong oxidizer, at high potentials, according to the following mechanism:

$\ce{PbO2[*OH] -> PbO2[O*] + H+ + e-}$

$\ce{PbO2[O*] + O2-> PbO2 + O3}$

Also, the electrochemical properties and the stability of these electrodes can be improved by selecting the proper crystal structure: the highly crystalline beta-phase of lead dioxide showed improved performance in the removal of phenols, due to the increased active surface provided by its porous structure. Moreover, incorporation of metallic species, such as Fe, Bi or As, within the film was found to increase the current efficiency for mineralization.

=== Boron-doped diamond (BDD) ===
Synthetic diamond is doped with Boron to raise its conductivity, making it feasible as electrochemical electrode. Once doped, BDD electrodes show high chemical and electrochemical stability, good conductivity, great resistance to corrosion even in harsh environment and a remarkable wide potential window (2.3 V vs SHE). For this reason, BDD is generally considered as the most effective electrode for complete mineralization of organics, providing high current efficiency as well as lower energy consumption compared to all other electrodes. At the same time, the manufacturing processes for this electrode, usually based on high temperature CVD technologies, are very costly.Nanocrystalline boron-doped diamond (BDD) films are used in a range of electrochemical applications because of their wide potential window, low background current, and resistance to surface fouling. These properties enable stable operation during extended voltammetric cycling, allowing BDD microelectrodes to function reliably in microsensing and environmental monitoring contexts where conventional carbon electrodes often degrade.

== Reaction kinetics ==
Once the hydroxyl radicals are formed on the electrode surface, they rapidly react with organic pollutants, resulting in a lifetime of few nanoseconds. However, a transfer of ions from the bulk of the solution to the proximity of the electrode surface is required for the reaction to occur. Above a certain potential, the active species formed near the electrode are immediately consumed and the diffusion through the boundary layer near the electrode surface becomes the limiting step of the process. This explains why the observed rate of some fast electrode reactions can be low due to transport limitations. Evaluation of the limiting current density can be used as a tool to assess whether the electrochemical process is in diffusion control or not. If the mass transfer coefficient for the system is known, the limiting current density can be defined for a generic organic pollutant according to the relation:

$j_L=\frac{Fk_dCOD}{8}$

Where j_{L} is the limiting current density (A/m^{2}), F is the Faraday's constant (96'485 C/mol), k_{d} is the mass transfer coefficient (m/s), COD is the chemical oxygen demand for the organic pollutant (g/dm^{3}) and 8 is the oxygen equivalent mass.

According to this equation, the lower the COD the lower the corresponding limiting current. Hence, systems with low COD are likely to be operating in diffusion control, exhibiting pseudo-first order kinetics with exponential decrease. Conversely, for high COD concentration (roughly above 4000 mg/L) pollutants are degraded under kinetic control (actual current below the limiting value), following a linear trend according to zero-order kinetics. For intermediate values, the COD initially decreases linearly, under kinetic control, but below a critical COD value diffusion becomes the limiting step, resulting in an exponential trend.

If the limiting current density is obtained with other analytical procedures, such as cyclic voltammetry, the proposed equation can be used to retrieve the corresponding mass transfer coefficient for the investigated system.

== Applications ==
Given the thorough investigations on the process design and electrodes formulation, electro-oxidation has already been applied to both pilot-scale and full-stage commercially available plants. Some relevant cases are listed below:

1. Oxineo and Sysneo are dedicated product for disinfection of public and private pools, where radicals are generated through electro-oxidation with BDD electrodes in order to destroy the microorganisms in the water. Compared to other disinfection methods, these systems do not require chemicals dosing, they do not produce any chlorine smell and they prevent algae formation and accumulation.
2. CONDIAS and Advanced Diamond Technologies Inc. supply equipment for anodic oxidation with BDD electrodes, sold with the trademark of CONDIACELL and Diamonox, which can be used either for water disinfection or for industrial effluents treatment.
3. A pilot plant was installed in 2007 in Cantabria (Spain), featuring an electro-oxidation with BDD electrodes as a final stage after aerobic remediation and chemical Fenton oxidation. The overall removal efficiency for organic pollutants was 99% for the combined processes.

== See also ==
- Wastewater treatment
- List of wastewater treatment technologies
- Advanced oxidation process
