= Butler–Volmer equation =

Equation characterising electrochemical kinetics

In electrochemistry, the Butler–Volmer equation (named after John Alfred Valentine Butler and Max Volmer), also known as Erdey-Grúz–Volmer equation (after Tibor Erdey-Grúz), is one of the most fundamental relationships in electrochemical kinetics. It describes how the electrical current through an electrode depends on the voltage difference between the electrode and the bulk electrolyte for a simple, unimolecular redox reaction, considering that both a cathodic and an anodic reaction occur on the same electrode:

== Butler–Volmer equation ==
The upper graph shows the current density as a function of the overpotential η. The anodic and cathodic current densities are shown as j_{a} and j_{c}, respectively for α = α_{a} = α_{c} = 0.5, and j_{0} = 1 mA/cm^{2} (close to values for platinum and palladium). The lower graph shows the logarithmic plot for different values of α (Tafel plot).

The Butler–Volmer equation is:

$$j =  j_0 \cdot \left\{ \exp \left[ \frac { \alpha_{\rm a} zF } {RT} (E - E_{\rm eq}) \right] - \exp \left[ - { \frac { \alpha_{\rm c} zF } {RT}} (E - E_{\rm eq}) \right] \right\}$$

or in a more compact form:

$$j= j_0 \cdot \left\{ \exp \left[ \frac { \alpha_{\rm a} zF \eta} {RT} \right] - \exp \left[ - { \frac { \alpha_{\rm c} zF \eta} {RT}} \right] \right\}$$

where:

- $j$: electrode current density, A/m^{2} (defined as $j = I/S$)
- $j_0$: exchange current density, A/m^{2}
- $E$: electrode potential, V
- $E_{\rm eq}$: equilibrium potential, V
- $T$: absolute temperature, K
- $z$: number of electrons involved in the electrode reaction
- $F$: Faraday constant
- $R$: universal gas constant
- $\alpha_{\rm c}$: so-called cathodic charge transfer coefficient, dimensionless
- $\alpha_{\rm a}$: so-called anodic charge transfer coefficient, dimensionless
- $\eta$: activation overpotential (defined as $\eta = E - E_{\rm eq}$).

The right hand figure shows plots valid for $\alpha_{\rm a} = 1 - \alpha_{\rm c}$.

=== Limiting cases ===
There are two limiting cases of the Butler–Volmer equation:

- the low overpotential region (called "polarization resistance", i.e., when E ≈ E_{eq}), where the Butler–Volmer equation simplifies to:

$$j = j_0\frac {zF} {RT} (E-E_{\rm eq})$$;

- the high overpotential region, where the Butler–Volmer equation simplifies to the Tafel equation. When $(E-E_{\rm eq})>>0$, the first term dominates, and when $(E-E_{\rm eq})<<0$, the second term dominates.

$E-E_{\rm eq} = a_{\rm c} - b_{\rm c} \log j$ for a cathodic reaction, when E << E_{eq}, or
$E-E_{\rm eq} = a_{\rm a} + b_{\rm a} \log j$ for an anodic reaction, when E >> E_{eq}

where $a$ and $b$ are constants (for a given reaction and temperature) and are called the Tafel equation constants. The theoretical values of the Tafel equation constants are different for the cathodic and anodic processes. However, the Tafel slope $b$ can be defined as:

$$b = \left ( \frac{ \partial E}{\partial \ln |I_{\rm F}|} \right)_{c_i,T,p}$$

where $I_{\rm F}$ is the faradaic current, expressed as $I_{\rm F} = I_{\rm c} + I_{\rm a}$, being $I_{\rm c}$ and $I_{\rm a}$ the cathodic and anodic partial currents, respectively.

== Extended Butler–Volmer equation ==
The more general form of the Butler–Volmer equation, applicable to the mass transfer-influenced conditions, can be written as:

$$j = j_0  \left\{ {\frac {c_{\rm o}(0,t)} {c_{\rm o}^*}} \exp \left[ \frac { \alpha_{\rm a} zF \eta} { RT } \right] - {\frac {c_{\rm r}(0,t)} {c_{\rm r}^*}} \exp \left[ - { \frac { \alpha_{\rm c} zF \eta} { RT } } \right] \right\}$$

where:

- j is the current density, A/m^{2},
- c_{o} and c_{r} refer to the concentration of the species to be oxidized and to be reduced, respectively,
- c(0,t) is the time-dependent concentration at a distance of zero from the surface of the electrode.

The above form simplifies to the conventional expression (shown at the top of the article) when the concentration of the electroactive species at the surface is equal to that in the bulk. The concentration at the surface of the electrode can differ from the bulk concentration because of the formation of the electrical double layer (EDL) and mass transportation limitations during the reaction.

The effect of the EDL was first formalized by Alexander N. Frumkin and is incorporated in the Frumkin–Butler-Volmer theory. The variation of the electrochemical potential in the vicinity of the electrode surface modifies the local concentration of ionic species, thereby affecting electrochemical reaction involving them.

Mass transportation also influences the reaction rate. There are two rates which determine the current-voltage relationship for an electrode. First is the rate of the chemical reaction at the electrode, which consumes reactants and produces products. This is known as the charge transfer rate. The second is the rate at which reactants are supplied to, and products are removed from, the electrode region via processes such as diffusion, migration, and convection. The latter is known as the mass-transfer rate. (Note: For example, if the mass transfer rate is due to diffusion alone, there is a maximum rate at which reactants can be provided to the electrode, and therefore a maximum current possible, known as the limiting current. The limiting current, when the electrode process is highly mass-transfer controlled, the value of the current density is: $$j_{\text{limiting}} = \frac {zFD_{\rm eff}} {\delta} c^*$$ where: D_{eff} is the effective diffusion coefficient (taking tortuosity into account, if any); δ is the diffusion layer thickness; c^{*} is the concentration of the electroactive (limiting) species in the bulk of the electrolyte.) These two rates determine the concentrations of the reactants and products at the electrode, which they in turn determine. The slowest of these rates will determine the overall rate of the process.

The simple Butler–Volmer equation assumes that the concentrations at the electrode are approximately equal to those in the bulk electrolyte, allowing the current to be expressed as a function of potential only. In other words, it assumes that the mass-transfer rate is much greater than the reaction rate and that the slower chemical rate dominates the reaction. Despite this limitation, the utility of the Butler–Volmer equation in electrochemistry is wide, and it is often considered to be "central in the phenomenological electrode kinetics".

The extended Butler–Volmer equation does not make this assumption; instead, it treats the concentrations at the electrode as given, yielding a relationship in which the current is expressed as a function not only of potential but also of the given concentrations. The mass-transfer rate may be relatively low, but its only effect on the chemical reaction is through the altered (given) concentrations. In effect, the concentrations are also a function of the potential. A full treatment, which yields the current as a function of potential only, will be expressed by the extended Butler–Volmer equation, but will require explicit inclusion of mass-transfer effects to express the concentrations as functions of the potential.

=== Derivation ===
==== General expression ====
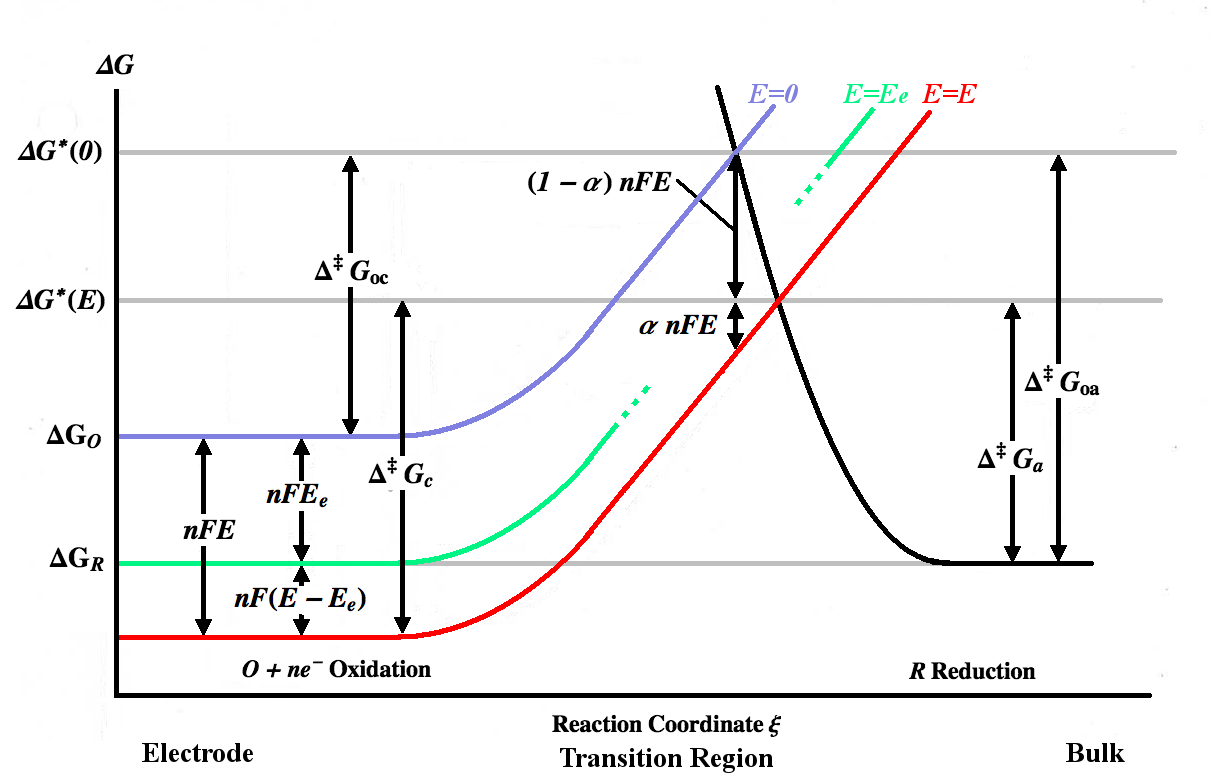
A plot of various Gibbs energies as a function of reaction coordinate. The reaction will proceed towards the lower energy – reducing for the blue curve, oxidizing for the red curve. The green curve illustrates equilibrium.

The following derivation of the extended Butler–Volmer equation is adapted from that of Bard and Faulkner and Newman and Thomas-Alyea. For a simple unimolecular, one-step redox reaction of the form:

Oxidant + n e^{−} → Reductant

O + n e^{−} → R

The forward and backward reaction rates (v_{f} and v_{b}) and, from Faraday's laws of electrolysis, the associated electrical current densities (j), may be written as:

$$v_f=k_f c_o = j_f/n F$$
$$v_b=k_b c_r = j_b/n F$$

where k_{f} and k_{b} are the reaction rate constants, with units of frequency (1/time) and c_{o} and c_{r} are the surface concentrations (mol/area) of the oxidized and reduced molecules, respectively (written as c_{o}(0,t) and c_{r}(0,t) in the previous section). The net rate of reaction v and net current density j are then: (Note: Bard chooses the current to be proportional to the net forward rate, but chooses the potential E to be that of the electrode minus that of the electrolyte, which has the disconcerting (but not inconsistent) effect of yielding a positive current for a negative potential. The convention of Newman in which the current is chosen proportional to the net backward rate is used here to align with the results of the sections above.)

$$v=v_b-v_f = \frac{j_b-j_f}{nF}=\frac{j}{nF}$$

The figure above plots various Gibbs energy curves as a function of the reaction coordinate ξ. The reaction coordinate is approximately a measure of distance, with the electrode body on the left and the bulk solution on the right. The blue energy curve shows the increase in Gibbs energy of an oxidized molecule as it moves toward the electrode surface in the absence of an applied potential. The black energy curve shows the increase in Gibbs energy as a reduced molecule moves closer to the electrode. The two energy curves intersect at $\Delta G^*(0)$. Applying a potential E to the electrode will move the energy curve downward (Note: Raising the potential of ions from zero to E will increase their $\Delta G$ by $E\Delta q$ where $\Delta q$ is the charge on the ions (see electrochemical potential). Increasing the potential of the electrode will decrease the potential of ions near the electrode relative to the electrode, thus decreasing their $\Delta G$.) (to the red curve) by nFE and the intersection point will move to $\Delta G^*(E)$. $\Delta^\ddagger G_c$ and $\Delta^\ddagger G_a$ are the activation energies (energy barriers) to be overcome by the oxidized and reduced species, respectively, for a general E. In contrast, $\Delta^\ddagger G_{oc}$ and $\Delta^\ddagger G_{oa}$ are the activation energies for E = 0. (Note: The reducing energy curve (black) may be affected by the potential, but the conclusions are not affected by this as long as the sum of the oxidizing and reducing curve displacements are equal to nFE)

Assume that the rate constants are well approximated by an Arrhenius equation,

$$k_f=A_f \exp[-\Delta^\ddagger G_c/RT]$$
$$k_b=A_b \exp[-\Delta^\ddagger G_a/RT]$$

where the A_{f} and A_{b} are constants such that A_{f} c_{o} = A_{b} c_{r} is the "correctly oriented" O-R collision frequency. The exponential term (Boltzmann factor) is the fraction of those collisions with sufficient energy to overcome the barrier and react.

Assuming that the energy curves are practically linear in the transition region, they may be represented there by:

$\Delta G=S_c \xi+K_c$	(blue curve)
$\Delta G=S_c \xi+K_c-nFE$	(red curve)
$\Delta G=-S_a \xi+K_a$	(black curve)

The charge transfer coefficient for this simple case is equivalent to the symmetry factor, and can be expressed in terms of the slopes of the energy curves:

$$\alpha=\frac{S_c}{S_a+S_c}$$

It follows that:

$$\Delta^\ddagger G_c = \Delta^\ddagger G_{oc}+\alpha nFE$$
$$\Delta^\ddagger G_a = \Delta^\ddagger G_{oa}-(1-\alpha) nFE$$

For conciseness, define:

$$f_\alpha=\alpha nF/RT$$
$$f_\beta=(1-\alpha) nF/RT$$
$$f=f_\alpha+f_\beta = nF/RT$$

The rate constants can now be expressed as:

$$k_f=k_{fo}e^{-f_\alpha E}$$
$$k_b=k_{bo}e^{f_\beta E}$$

where the rate constants at zero potential are:

$$k_{fo} = A_f e^{-\Delta^\ddagger G_{oc}/RT}$$
$$k_{bo} = A_b e^{-\Delta^\ddagger G_{oa}/RT}$$

The current density j as a function of applied potential E may now be written:

$$j = nF(c_r k_{bo} e^{f_\beta E}-c_o k_{fo} e^{-f_\alpha E})$$

==== Expression in terms of the equilibrium potential ====
At a certain voltage E_{e}, equilibrium will be attained and the forward and backward rates (v_{f} and v_{b}) will be equal. The green curve in the above figure represents this. The equilibrium rate constants will be written as k_{fe} and k_{be}, and the equilibrium concentrations will be written c_{oe} and c_{re}. The equilibrium currents (j_{ce} and j_{ae}) will be equal and are written as j_{o}, which is known as the exchange current density.

$$v_{fe}=k_{fe} c_{oe} = j_o/nF$$
$$v_{be}=k_{be} c_{re} = j_o/nF$$

Note that the net current density at equilibrium will be zero. The equilibrium rate constants are then:

$$k_{fe} = k_{fo}e^{-f_\alpha E_e}$$
$$k_{be} = k_{bo}e^{f_\beta E_e}$$

Solving the above for k_{fo} and k_{bo} in terms of the equilibrium concentrations c_{oe} and c_{re} and the exchange current density j_{o}, the current density j as a function of applied potential E may now be written:

$$j=j_o\left(\frac{c_r}{c_{re}}e^{f_\beta (E-E_e)}-\frac{c_o}{c_{oe}}e^{-f_\alpha (E-E_e)}\right)$$

Assuming that equilibrium holds in the bulk solution, with concentrations $c_o^*$ and $c_r^*$, it follows that $c_{oe}=c_o^*$ and $c_{re}=c_r^*$, and the above expression for the current density j is then the Butler–Volmer equation. Note that E-E_{e} is also known as η, the activation overpotential.

==== Expression in terms of the formal potential ====
For the simple reaction, the change in Gibbs energy is: (Note: Note that the change in Gibbs energy is also equal to $\Delta^\ddagger G_{oa}-\Delta^\ddagger G_{oc}$)

$$\Delta G = \Delta G_o-\Delta G_r = (\Delta G_o^o-\Delta G_r^o) + RT\ln\left(\frac{a_{oe}}{a_{re}}\right)$$

where a_{oe} and a_{re} are the activities at equilibrium. The activities a are related to the concentrations c by a = γc, where γ is the activity coefficient. The equilibrium potential is given by the Nernst equation:

$$E_e=-\frac{\Delta G}{nF} = E^o - \frac{RT}{nF} \ln\left(\frac{a_{oe}}{a_{re}}\right)$$

where $E^o$ is the standard potential

$$E^o=-(\Delta G_o^o-\Delta G_r^o)/nF$$

Defining the formal potential:

$$E^{o'}=E^o-\frac{RT}{nF}\ln\left(\frac{\gamma_{oe}}{\gamma_{re}}\right)$$

The equilibrium potential is then:

$$E_e = E^{o'}-\frac{RT}{nF} \ln\left(\frac{c_{oe}}{c_{re}}\right)$$

Substituting this equilibrium potential into the Butler–Volmer equation yields:

$$j=\frac{j_o}{c_{oe}^{1-\alpha}c_{re}^\alpha}\left(c_r e^{f_\beta (E-E^{o'})}-c_o e^{-f_\alpha (E-E^{o'})}\right)$$

which may also be written in terms of the standard rate constant k^{o} as:

$$j=nFk^o\left(c_r e^{f_\beta (E-E^{o'})}-c_o e^{-f_\alpha (E-E^{o'})}\right)$$

The standard rate constant is an essential descriptor of electrode behavior, independent of concentrations. It is a measure of the rate at which the system will approach equilibrium. In the limit as $k^0\rightarrow 0$, the electrode becomes an ideal polarizable electrode and will behave electrically as an open circuit (neglecting capacitance). For nearly ideal electrodes with small k^{o}, large changes in the overpotential are required to generate a significant current. In the limit as $k^0\rightarrow \infty$, the electrode becomes an ideal non-polarizable electrode and will behave as an electrical short. For nearly ideal electrodes with large k^{o}, small changes in the overpotential will generate large changes in current.

== See also ==
- Advanced Simulation Library
- Nernst equation
- Goldman equation
- Tafel equation
