= Transfer coefficient =

Transfer coefficient may refer to:

== Transport phenomena ==
- Heat transfer coefficient
- Mass transfer coefficient

== Electrochemistry ==
- Charge transfer coefficient

== Non-scalar coefficients ==
Transfer coefficients which take the form of a matrix are sometimes called a transfer matrix.

== See also ==
- Transport coefficient
