= Albert Kónya =

Hungarian physicist and politician

Minister of Education of Hungary
- In office 30 July 1956 – 1 March 1957
- Preceded by: Tibor Erdey-Grúz
- Succeeded by: Gyula Kállai

Personal details
- Born: 14 June 1917 Szolnok, Austria-Hungary
- Died: 16 March 1988 (aged 70) Budapest, People's Republic of Hungary
- Party: MDP
- Spouse: Anna Vydra
- Children: Albert; László; Anikó
- Profession: physicist, politician

Albert Kónya (14 June 1917 – 16 March 1988) was a Hungarian physicist and politician, who served as Minister of Education between 1956 and 1957. He graduated from József Attila University of Szeged. He fought in the Second World War from 1942 until the end of the war. He was a prisoner of war for a short time in 1945. After the war he taught in the Budapest University of Technology and Economics. From 1950 he served as head of the Physics Department at the University of Miskolc. In 1951 he became dean of the Faculty of Mechanics.

In 1952 he was appointed Deputy Minister of Education, his first role in politics. Kónya held this position until 1956, aiding two ministers, József Darvas and Tibor Erdey-Grúz. In 1954 he was elected as alternate member of the Hungarian Working People's Party's Central Leadership. He became Minister of Education on 30 July 1956. He also held his position during the Hungarian Revolution of 1956.

Not long before the revolution he supported the students' university autonomy in Budapest and Szeged. He did not oblige students to learn Russian. After the uprising he was condemned because of his role in the second Imre Nagy cabinet and he had to resign from all of his political positions. Kónya returned to teaching.

== Personal life ==
He married Anna Vydra with whom he had three children – a daughter, Anikó and two sons, Albert and László.

Political offices
Preceded by Tibor Erdey-Grúz	Minister of Education; 1956–1957	Succeeded by Gyula Kállai
