= Stern–Volmer relationship =

Relationship describing the kinetics of intermolecular photochemical deactivation

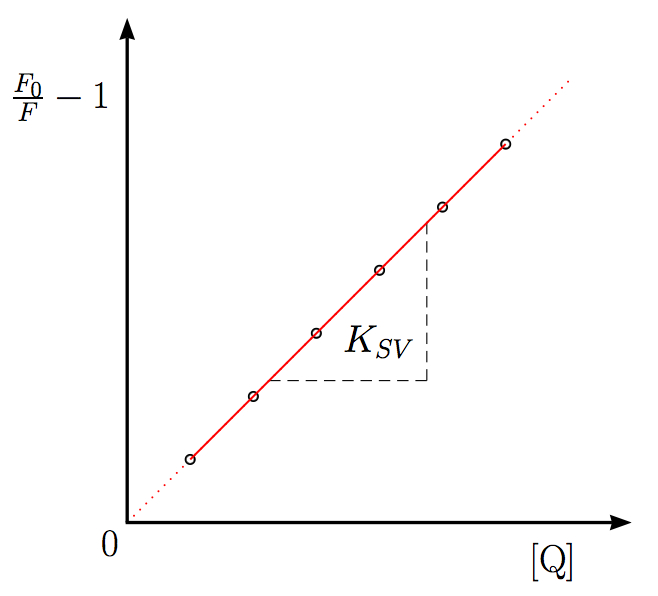
Stern–Volmer plot

The Stern–Volmer relationship, named after Otto Stern and Max Volmer, allows the kinetics of a photophysical intermolecular deactivation process to be explored.

Processes such as fluorescence and phosphorescence are examples of intramolecular deactivation (quenching) processes. An intermolecular deactivation is where the presence of another chemical species can accelerate the decay rate of a chemical in its excited state. In general, this process can be represented by a simple equation:

$$\mathrm{A}^* + \mathrm{Q} \rightarrow \mathrm{A} + \mathrm{Q}$$

or

$$\mathrm{A}^* + \mathrm{Q} \rightarrow \mathrm{A} + \mathrm{Q}^*$$

where A is one chemical species, Q is another (known as a quencher) and * designates an excited state.

The kinetics of this process follows the Stern–Volmer relationship:

$$\frac{I_f^0}{I_f} = 1+k_q\tau_0\cdot[\mathrm{Q}]$$

Where $I_f^0$ is the intensity, or rate of fluorescence, without a quencher, $I_f$ is the intensity, or rate of fluorescence, with a quencher, $k_q$ is the quencher rate coefficient, $\tau_0$ is the lifetime of the emissive excited state of A without a quencher present, and $[\mathrm{Q}]$ is the concentration of the quencher.

For diffusion-limited quenching (i.e., quenching in which the time for quencher particles to diffuse toward and collide with excited particles is the limiting factor, and almost all such collisions are effective), the quenching rate coefficient is given by $k_q = {8RT}/{3\eta}$, where $R$ is the ideal gas constant, $T$ is temperature in kelvins and $\eta$ is the viscosity of the solution. This formula is derived from the Stokes–Einstein relation and is only useful in this form in the case of two spherical particles of identical radius that react every time they approach a distance R, which is equal to the sum of their two radii. The more general expression for the diffusion limited rate constant is

$k_q = \frac{2RT}{3\eta}[\frac{r_b + r_a}{r_br_a}]d_{cc}$

Where $r_a$ and $r_b$ are the radii of the two molecules and $d_{cc}$ is an approach distance at which unity reaction efficiency is expected (this is an approximation).

In reality, only a fraction of the collisions with the quencher are effective at quenching, so the true quenching rate coefficient must be determined experimentally.

== See also ==
Optode, a chemical sensor that makes use of this relationship
