= Charge transfer coefficient =

Two related parameters used in description of the kinetics of electrochemical reactions

Charge transfer coefficient, and symmetry factor (symbols α and β, respectively) are two related parameters used in description of the kinetics of electrochemical reactions. They appear in the Butler–Volmer equation and related expressions.

The symmetry factor and the charge transfer coefficient are dimensionless.

According to an IUPAC definition, for a reaction with a single rate-determining step, the charge transfer coefficient for a cathodic reaction (the cathodic transfer coefficient, α_{c}) is defined as:

$$\frac {\alpha_{\rm c}} {\nu} = - \frac {RT} {nF}  \left( \frac {\partial \ln |I_{\rm red}|} {\partial E}\right)_{p,T,c_i^{\rm interface}}$$

The anodic transfer coefficient (α_{a}) is defined by analogy:

$$\frac {\alpha_{\rm a}} {\nu} =  \frac {RT} {nF}  \left( \frac {\partial \ln |I_{\rm ox }|} {\partial E}\right)_{p,T,c_i^{\rm interface}}$$

where:

- $\nu$: stoichiometric number, i.e., the number of activated complexes formed and destroyed in the overall reaction (with n electrons)
- $R$: universal gas constant
- $T$: absolute temperature
- $n$: number of electrons involved in the electrode reaction
- $F$: Faraday constant
- $E$: electrode potential
- $I$: partial cathodic (anodic) current

== Significance ==
The charge transfer coefficient signifies the fraction of the interfacial potential at an electrode-electrolyte interface that helps in lowering the free energy barrier for the electrochemical reaction. The electroactive ion present in the interfacial region experiences the interfacial potential and electrostatic work is done on the ion by a part of the interfacial electric field. It is charge transfer coefficient that signifies this part that is utilized in activating the ion to the top of the free energy barrier.

== Batteries and fuel cells ==
In operating batteries and fuel cells, charge transfer coefficient is the parameter that signifies the fraction of overpotential that affects the current density. This parameter has had a mysterious significance in electrochemical kinetics for over three quarters of the previous century. It can also be said that charge transfer coefficient is the heart of electrode kinetics.

== Symmetry factor ==
The symmetry factor (or barrier symmetry factor) is a coefficient similar to the transfer coefficient, but applicable only to single-step reactions.

The sum of anodic symmetry factor and cathodic symmetry factor is equal to one:

$$\beta_{\rm c} + \beta_{\rm a} = 1$$
