= Tafel equation =

Equation relating the rate of an electrochemical reaction to the overpotential

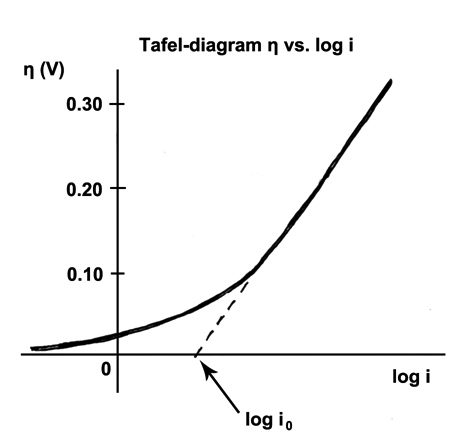
Tafel plot for an anodic process (oxidation)

The Tafel equation is an equation in electrochemical kinetics relating the rate of an electrochemical reaction to the overpotential.

The equation is named after Swiss chemist Julius Tafel.

== History ==
In 1905, Tafel had observed that the voltage shift (an overpotential $\eta$) caused by current density $j$ flowing through a mercury, lead, or cadmium cathode is well-described by a simple formula:

$\eta = a + b \log j$	1

Tafel had observed that the value of the slope $b$ had a logarithmic dependence on the absolute temperature of the cathode.

From the 1920s, theoretical justifications were developed for Tafel's equation. These provide meaningful definitions for the values of its constants $a$ and $b$. The slope parameter $b$ is sometimes called Tafel's slope.

Studies of other electrochemical processes have shed light on the conditions under which Tafel's equation is a valid approximation. For example, the overpotential must be large, i.e. $|\eta/b| \geq 1$.

More complicated equations, such as the Butler-Volmer equation, have been developed to cover cases where Tafel's equation is an inadequate approximation. However Tafel's equation is still of practical importance. For just one example: the current-limiting effect of the solid electrolyte interphase layer on the graphite cathode in a lithium-ion battery was found to be adequately modelled by (what is now considered to be) a Tafel simplification of the Butler-Volmer equation.

== See also ==
- Overpotential
- Butler–Volmer equation
- Electrocatalyst
- Faradaic current
- Faraday's laws of electrolysis
