= Electrosynthesis =

Synthesis of chemical compounds in an electrochemical cell

In electrochemistry, electrosynthesis is the synthesis of chemical compounds in an electrochemical cell. Compared to ordinary redox reactions, electrosynthesis sometimes offers improved selectivity and yields. In electrosynthesis, the reactants are activated in-situ using energy from an applied electric field. Electrosynthesis may be better aligned with principles of Green Chemistry compared to reactions using traditional stoichiometric reagents; they may improve energy efficiency, waste, safety or atom economy. However, it may still require hazardous solvents, electrolytes, conductivity aids, or sacrificial reagents, which must be considered. Electrosynthesis is actively studied as a science and also has industrial applications. Electrooxidation has potential for wastewater treatment as well.

== Experimental setup ==
The basic setup in electrosynthesis is a galvanic cell, a potentiostat and two electrodes. Typical solvent and electrolyte combinations minimizes electrical resistance. Protic conditions often use alcohol-water or dioxane-water solvent mixtures with an electrolyte such as a soluble salt, acid or base. Aprotic conditions often use an organic solvent such as acetonitrile or dichloromethane with electrolytes such as lithium perchlorate or tetrabutylammonium salts. The choice of electrodes with respect to their composition and surface area can be decisive. For example, in aqueous conditions the competing reactions in the cell are the formation of oxygen at the anode and hydrogen at the cathode. In this case a graphite anode and lead cathode could be used effectively because of their high overpotentials for oxygen and hydrogen formation respectively. Many other materials can be used as electrodes. Other examples include platinum, magnesium, mercury (as a liquid pool in the reactor), stainless steel or reticulated vitreous carbon. Some reactions use a sacrificial electrode that is consumed during the reaction like zinc or lead. Cell designs can be undivided cell or divided cell type. In divided cells the cathode and anode chambers are separated with a semiporous membrane. Common membrane materials include sintered glass, porous porcelain, polytetrafluoroethene or polypropylene. The purpose of the divided cell is to permit the diffusion of ions while restricting the flow of the products and reactants. This separation simplifies workup. An example of a reaction requiring a divided cell is the reduction of nitrobenzene to phenylhydroxylamine, where the latter chemical is susceptible to oxidation at the anode.

== Reactions ==
Organic oxidations take place at the anode. Compounds are reduced at the cathode. Radical intermediates are often invoked. The initial reaction takes place at the surface of the electrode and then the intermediates diffuse into the solution where they participate in secondary reactions.

The yield of an electrosynthesis is expressed both in terms of the chemical yield and current efficiency. Current efficiency is the ratio of Coulombs consumed in forming the products to the total number of Coulombs passed through the cell. Side reactions decrease the current efficiency.

The potential drop between the electrodes determines the rate constant of the reaction. Electrosynthesis is carried out with either constant potential or constant current. The reason one chooses one over the other is due to a trade-off of ease of experimental conditions versus current efficiency. Constant potential uses current more efficiently because the current in the cell decreases with time due to the depletion of the substrate around the working electrode (stirring is usually necessary to decrease the diffusion layer around the electrode). This is not the case under constant current conditions, however. Instead, as the substrate's concentration decreases the potential across the cell increases in order to maintain the fixed reaction rate. This consumes current in side reactions produced outside the target voltage.

=== Anodic oxidations ===
==== C-C coupling ====
Oxidation of a carbanion can lead to a coupling reaction for instance in the electrosynthesis of the tetramethyl ester of ethanetetracarboxylic acid from the corresponding malonate ester

A well-known electrosynthesis is the Kolbe electrolysis, in which two carboxylic acids decarboxylate, and the remaining radicals couple:

A variation is called the non-Kolbe reaction when a heteroatom (nitrogen or oxygen) is present at the α-position. The intermediate oxonium ion is trapped by a nucleophile, usually solvent.

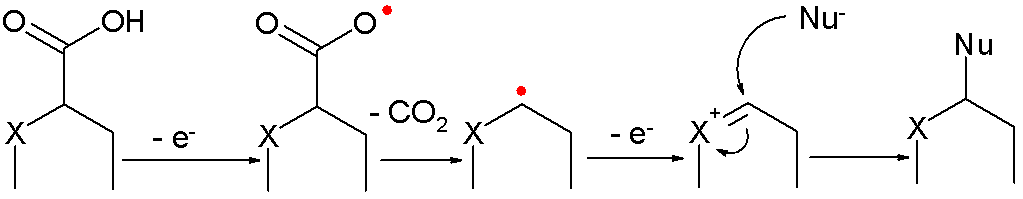

==== Amines to nitrile ====
Anodic electrosynthesis oxidize primary aliphatic amine to nitrile.

α-amino acids form nitriles and carbon dioxide via oxidative decarboxylation at AgO anodes (the latter is formed in-situ by oxidation of Ag_{2}O):

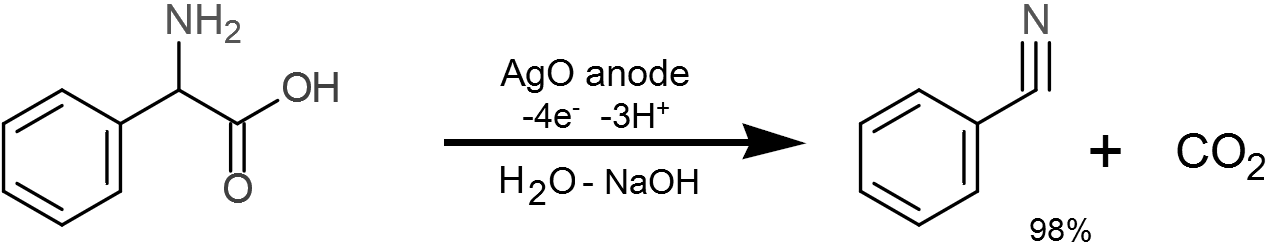

Cyanoacetic acid from cathodic reduction of carbon dioxide and anodic oxidation of acetonitrile.

==== Amides ====
Amides can be oxidized to N-acyliminium ions, which can be captured by various nucleophiles, for example:

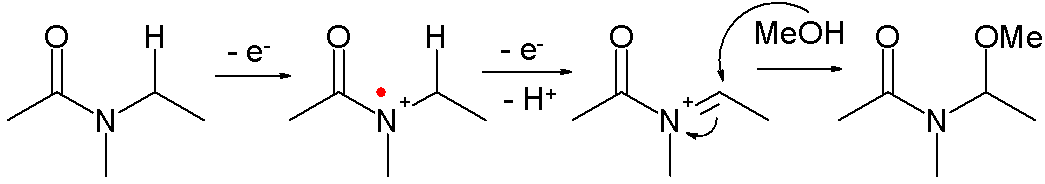

This reaction type is called a Shono oxidation. An example is the α-methoxylation of N-carbomethoxypyrrolidine

==== Alcohols to carboxylic acids ====
Propiolic acid is prepared commercially by oxidizing propargyl alcohol at a lead dioxide electrode. Similarly, 1,4-butynediol is oxidized to acetylenedicarboxylic acid.

=== Cathodic reductions ===
- In the Markó–Lam deoxygenation, an alcohol could be almost instantaneously deoxygenated by electroreducing its toluate ester.

- In concept, adiponitrile is prepared from dimerizing acrylonitrile:

2 CH_{2}=CHCN + 2 e^{−} + 2 H^{+} → NC(CH_{2})_{4}CN
In practice, the cathodic hydrodimerization of activated olefins is applied industrially in the synthesis of adiponitrile from two equivalents of acrylonitrile:
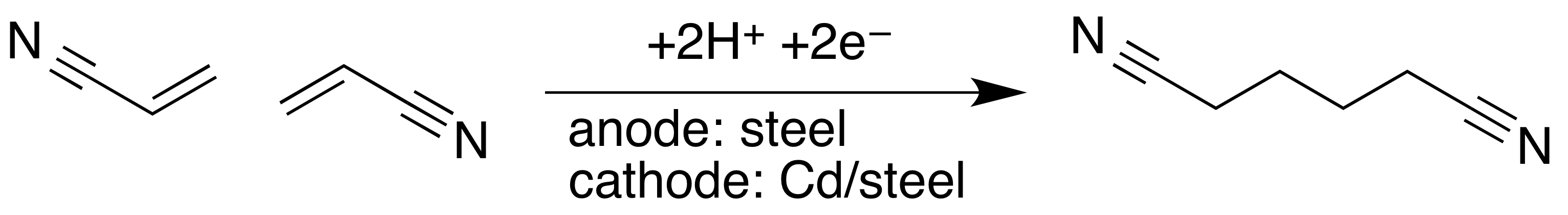

- The cathodic reduction of arene compounds to the 1,4-dihydro derivatives is similar to a Birch reduction. Examples from industry are the reduction of phthalic acid:

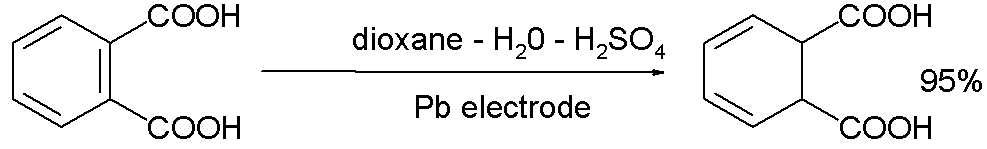

and the reduction of 2-methoxynaphthalene:

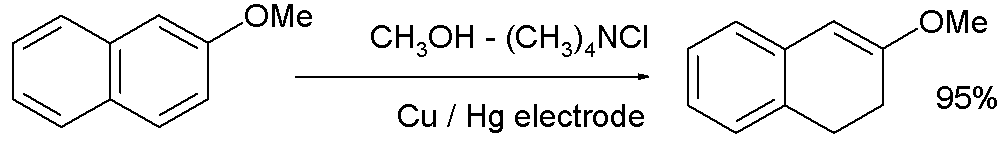

- The Tafel rearrangement, named for Julius Tafel, was at one time an important method for the synthesis of certain hydrocarbons from alkylated ethyl acetoacetate, a reaction accompanied by the rearrangement reaction of the alkyl group:

- The cathodic reduction of a nitrile to a primary amine in a divided cell; the cathodic reduction of benzyl cyanide to phenethylamine is shown:

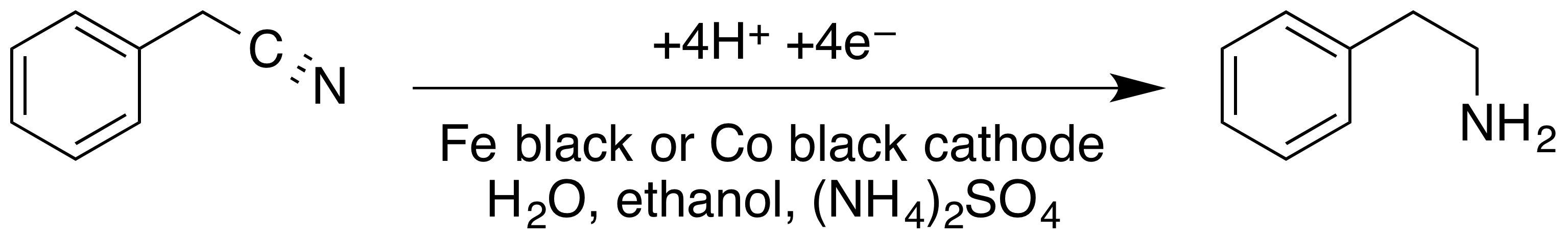

- Cathodic reduction of a nitroalkene can give the oxime in good yield. At higher negative reduction potentials, the nitroalkene can be reduced further, giving the primary amine but with lower yield.

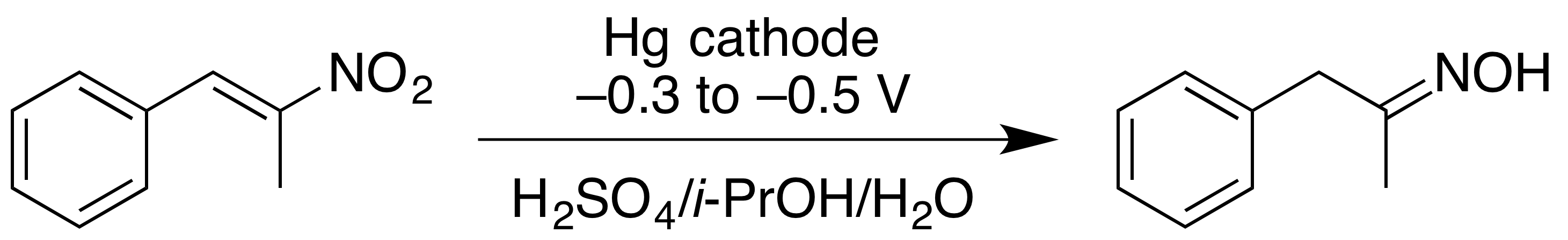
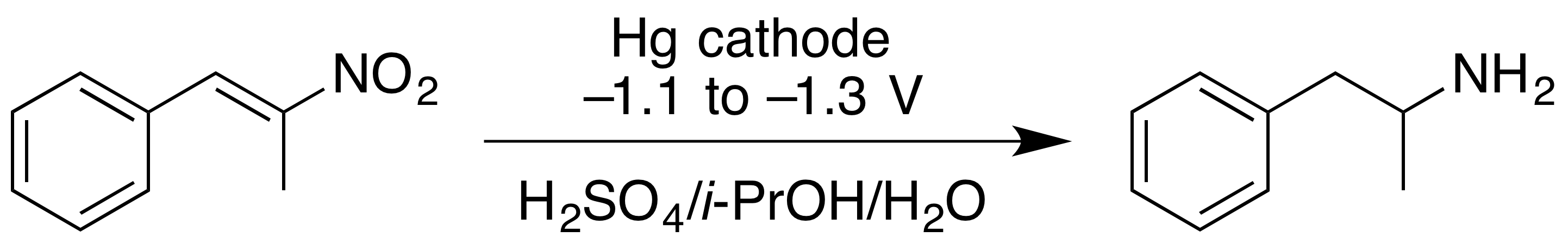

- Azobenzene is prepared in industrial electrosynthesis using nitrobenzene.
- An electrochemical carboxylation of a para-isobutyl benzyl chloride to Ibuprofen is promoted under supercritical carbon dioxide.
- Cathodic reduction of a carboxylic acid (oxalic acid) to an aldehyde (glyoxylic acid, shows as the rare aldehyde form) in a divided cell:

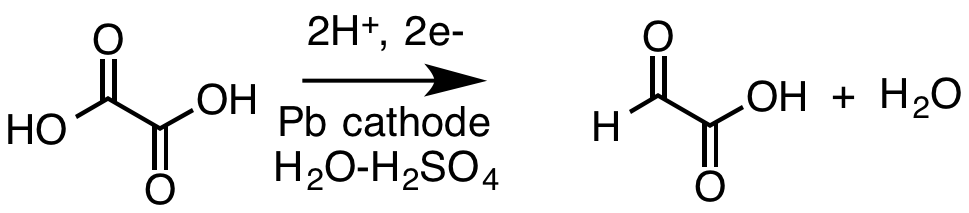

- Originally phenylpropanoic acid could be prepared from reduction of cinnamic acid by electrolysis.
- An electrocatalysis by a copper complex helps reduce carbon dioxide to oxalic acid; this conversion uses carbon dioxide as a feedstock to generate oxalic acid.
- It has been reported that formate can be formed by the electrochemical reduction of CO_{2} (in the form of bicarbonate) at a lead cathode at pH 8.6:

HCO^{−}_{3} + H_{2}O + 2e^{−} → HCO^{−}_{2} + 2OH^{−}

or

CO_{2} + H_{2}O + 2e^{−} → HCO^{−}_{2} + OH^{−}

If the feed is CO_{2} and oxygen is evolved at the anode, the total reaction is:

CO_{2} + OH^{−} → HCO^{−}_{2} + ^{1}/_{2} O_{2}

=== Redox reactions ===
- Cathodic reduction of carbon dioxide and anodic oxidation of acetonitrile afford cyanoacetic acid.
- An electrosynthesis employing alternating current prepares phenol at both the cathode and the anode.
- A green electrochemical procedure for methylene blue, using only dimethyl-4-phenylenediamine and sulfide ions has been proposed.

=== Electrofluorination ===
In organofluorine chemistry, many perfluorinated compounds are prepared by electrochemical synthesis, which is conducted in liquid HF at voltages near 5–6 V using Ni anodes. The method was invented in the 1930s. Amines, alcohols, carboxylic acids, and sulfonic acids are converted to perfluorinated derivatives using this technology. A solution or suspension of the hydrocarbon in hydrogen fluoride is electrolyzed at 5–6 V to produce high yields of the perfluorinated product.

== See also ==
- Electrochemical engineering
