= Immanuel Estermann =

German physicist (1900–1973)

- עמנואל אסתרמן
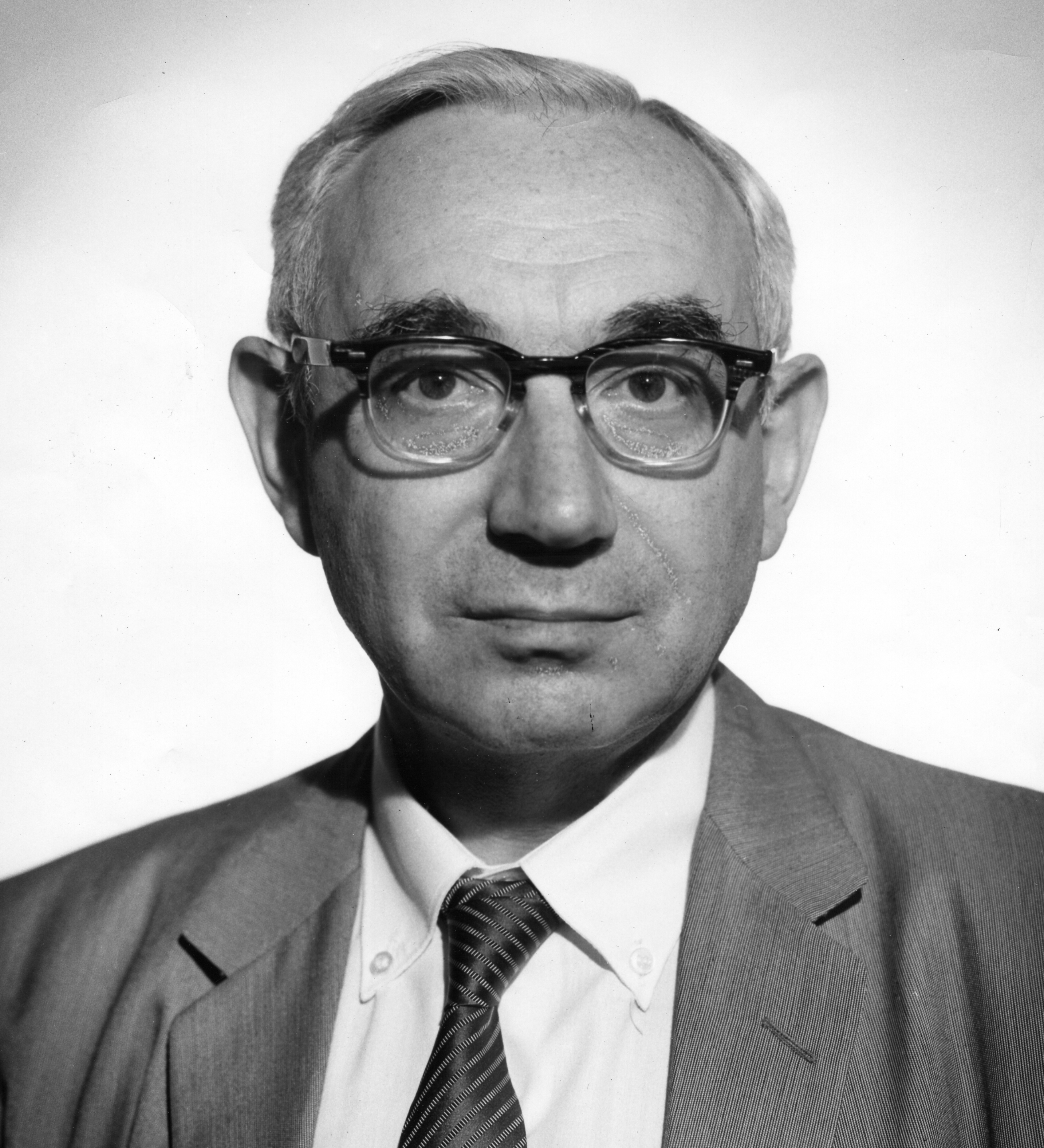
- Portrait 1959
- Born: 31 March 1900; Berlin, German Empire
- Died: 30 March 1973 (aged 72); Haifa, Israel
- Education: University of Hamburg
- Known for: Molecular beams proton magnetic moment
- Scientific career
- Fields: Physics
- Workplaces: Carnegie Mellon University; University of Hamburg; Technion
- Doctoral advisor: Max Volmer

Immanuel Estermann (Hebrew: עמנואל אסתרמן; March 31, 1900 – March 30, 1973) was a Jewish German-born nuclear physicist and was professor at Carnegie Mellon University, University of Hamburg and Technion. Estermann is known for his lifelong collaboration with Otto Stern which pioneered the research on molecular beams in the 1920s. With Stern and Otto Robert Frisch, he also first measured the magnetic moment of the proton.

== Biography ==
=== Early life ===
Immanuel Estermann was born in Berlin, Germany in 1900, son of Leo and Rachel Estermann. Estermann grew up in Jerusalem, where his father had moved with the family as an active Zionist. However, with the outbreak of the World War I, his family returned to Germany.

Immanuel Estermann is the older brother of the mathematician Theodor Estermann.

=== Career ===
Estermann studied physical chemistry in the University of Hamburg. There he worked on a successful doctoral thesis on the mechanism of crystal growth under the supervision of Max Volmer. He received his doctorate degree in Hamburg in 1921 and was a lecturer from 1922, working closely with Otto Stern on molecular beam research. Together they showed with this method that not only elementary particles like electrons have wave properties (previously shown by the Davisson–Germer experiment), but also molecules like the hydrogen atom and helium. A second work paper which was later cited in the award of the Nobel Prize in Physics to Stern, was the measurement, in collaboration with Otto Robert Frisch, of the magnetic moment of the proton in 1933.

As a Jew, he lost his position at the University of Hamburg when Nazism seized power. In 1933, Stern quit the University of Hamburg before being fired and received an invitation to work at Carnegie Institute of Technology in Pittsburgh, United States. Stern was glad to accept, provided they also offered a job to Estermann. Estermann arrived in United States with Stern via England, saving Estermann family as well. In Pittsburgh, Estermann soon became an associate professor, and professor after World War II. There Stern, Oliver C. Simpson and Estermann improved the accuracy of the magnetic moment of the proton. They also measured the collision cross section of cesium in helium.

In 1941 he became a Fellow of the American Physical Society (APS).

During World War II, Estermann worked on radar and later was transferred to the Manhattan Project, US secret program that produced the first atomic bomb. He also worked in the National Defense Research Committee, doing research on dark trace tubes.

After Stern retired and moved to University of California, Berkeley in 1950, Estermann went to work to the Office of Naval Research, initially as a consultant and head of the materials science department, and from 1959 as its scientific director in London.

=== Later life ===
Estermann became Emeritus Professor of the University of Hamburg in 1957. Later he went to Israel, where he became Lidow professor of solid state physics at the Technion – Israel Institute of Technology. Estermann died in Haifa in 1973.

== Books and reviews ==
- Methods of Experimental Physics. Volume 1: Classical methods. Academic Press 1959.
- Recent researches in molecular beams – a collection of papers dedicated to Otto Stern on the occasion of his 70th birthday. Academic Press 1959.
- with D. R. Bates: Advances in Atomic and Molecular Physics. Band 1 bis 8. 1965 bis 1973.
- History of molecular beam research: personal reminiscences of the important evolutionary period 1919–1933. In: American Journal of Physics. Band 43, 1975, S. 661.

== See also ==
- Helium atom scattering
