= Oxygen saturation =

Measure of dissolved or carried oxygen

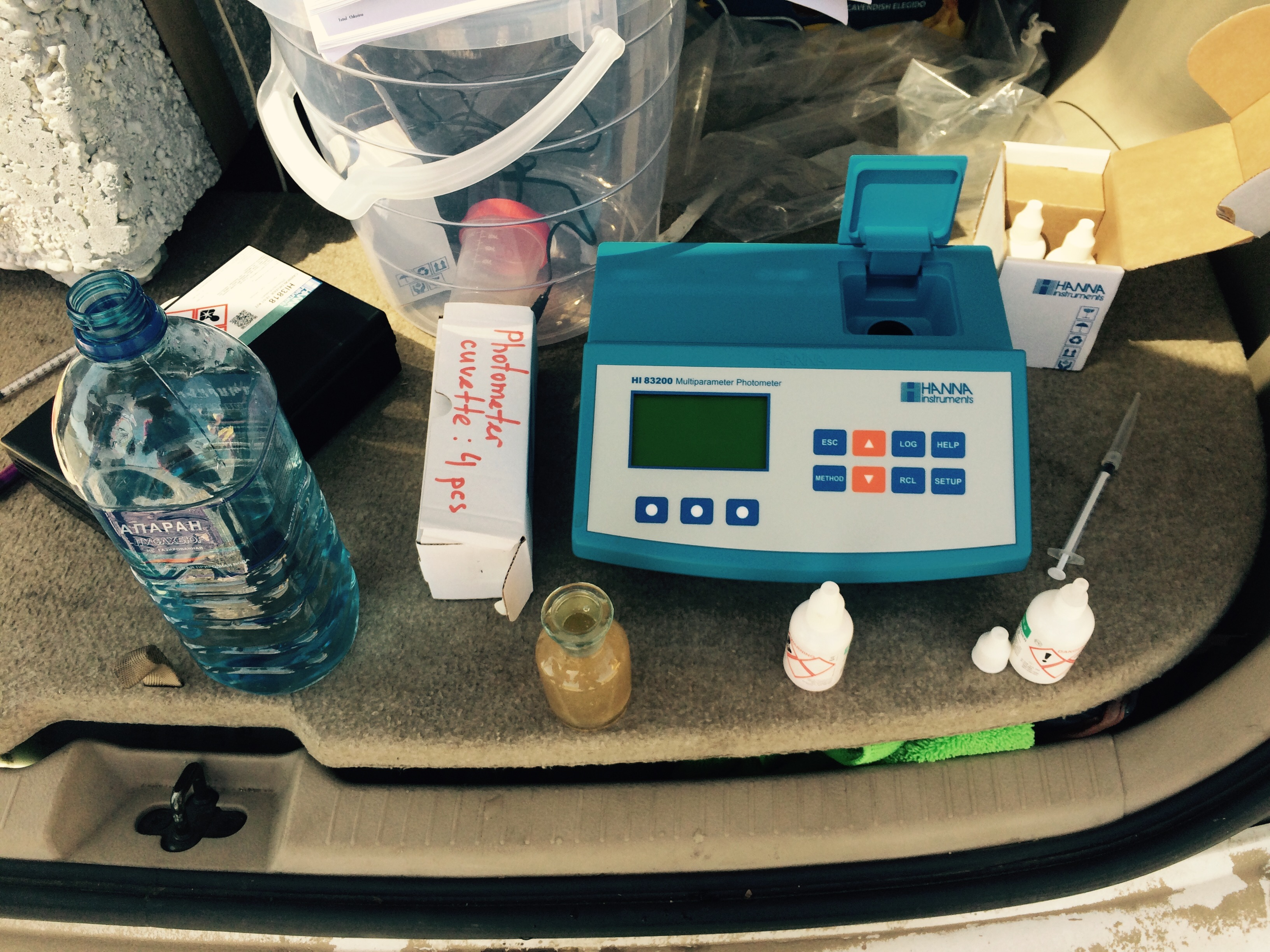
Measuring the dissolved oxygen through a multi-parameter photometer

Oxygen saturation (symbol SO_{2}) is a relative measure of the concentration of oxygen that is dissolved or carried in a given medium as a proportion of the maximal concentration that can be dissolved in that medium at the given temperature. It can be measured with a dissolved oxygen probe such as an oxygen sensor or an optode in liquid media, usually water. The standard unit of oxygen saturation is percent (%).

Oxygen saturation can be measured regionally and noninvasively. Arterial oxygen saturation (SaO_{2}) is commonly measured using pulse oximetry. Tissue saturation at peripheral scale can be measured using NIRS. This technique can be applied on both muscle and brain.

== In medicine ==
In medicine, oxygen saturation refers to oxygenation, or when oxygen molecules (O_{2}) enter the tissues of the body. In this case blood is oxygenated in the lungs, where oxygen molecules travel from the air into the blood. Oxygen saturation ((O_{2}) sats) measures the percentage of hemoglobin binding sites in the bloodstream occupied by oxygen. Fish, invertebrates, plants, and aerobic bacteria all require oxygen.

== In environmental science ==
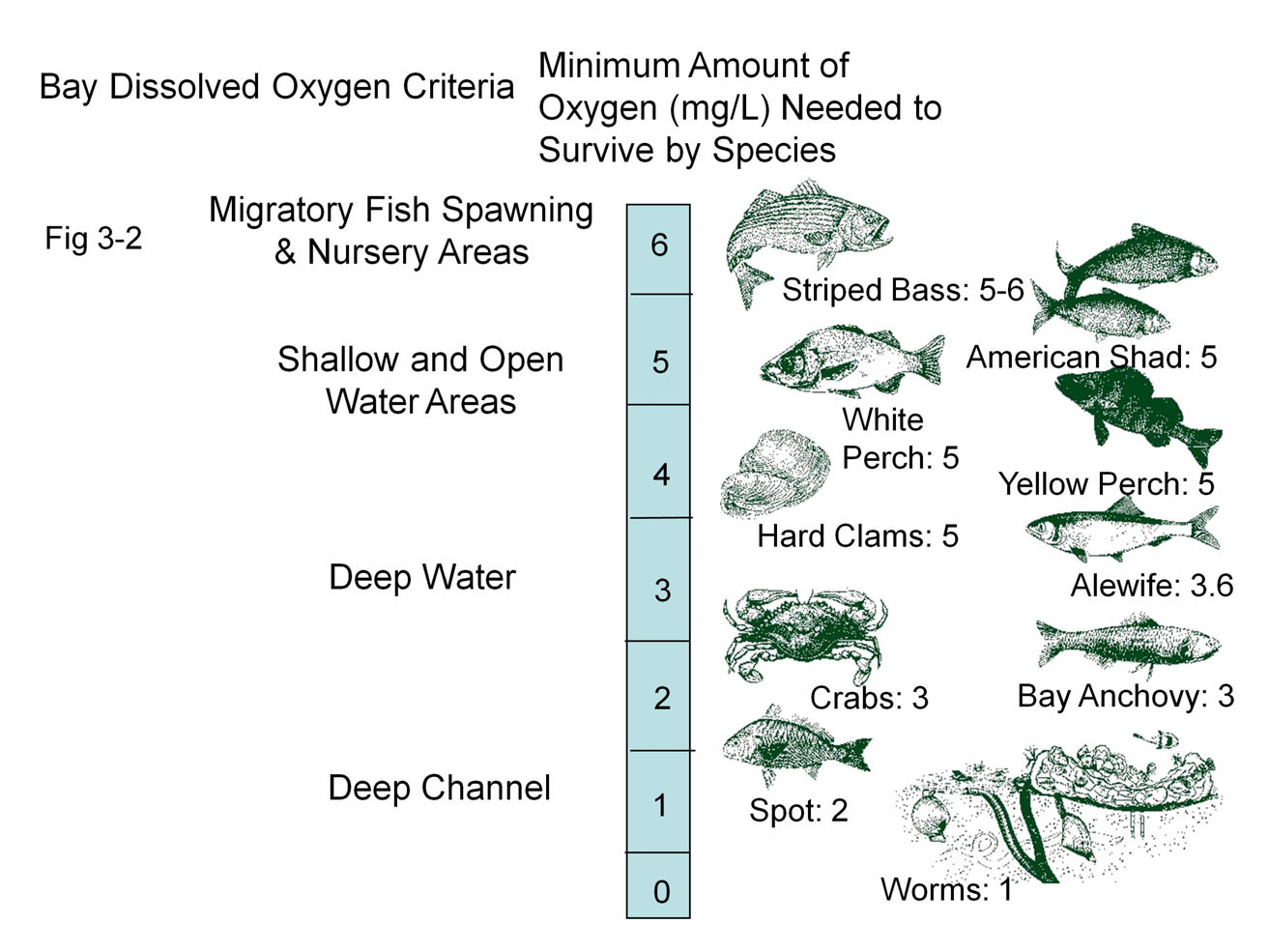
Dissolved oxygen levels required by various species in the Chesapeake Bay (US)

In aquatic environments, oxygen saturation is a ratio of the concentration of "dissolved oxygen" (DO, O_{2}), to the maximum amount of oxygen that will dissolve in that water body, at the temperature and pressure which constitute stable equilibrium conditions. Well-aerated water (such as a fast-moving stream) without oxygen producers or consumers is 100% saturated.

Stagnant water can become somewhat supersaturated with oxygen (i.e., reach more than 100% saturation) either because of the presence of photosynthetic aquatic oxygen producers or because of a slow equilibration after a change of atmospheric conditions. Stagnant water in the presence of decaying matter will typically have an oxygen concentration much less than 100%, which is due to anaerobic bacteria being much less efficient at breaking down organic material. Similarly as in water, oxygen concentration also plays a key role in the breakdown of organic matter in soils. Higher oxygen saturation allows aerobic bacteria to persist, which breaks down decaying organic material in soils much more efficiently than anaerobic bacteria. Thus, soils with high oxygen saturation will have less organic matter per volume than those with low oxygen saturation.

Environmental oxygenation can be important to the sustainability of a particular ecosystem. The US Environmental Protection Agency has published a table of maximum equilibrium dissolved oxygen concentration versus temperature at atmospheric pressure. The optimal levels in an estuary for dissolved oxygen is higher than six ppm. Insufficient oxygen (environmental hypoxia), often caused by the decomposition of organic matter and nutrient pollution, may occur in bodies of water such as ponds and rivers, tending to suppress the presence of aerobic organisms such as fish. Deoxygenation increases the relative population of anaerobic organisms such as plants and some bacteria, resulting in fish kills and other adverse events. The net effect is to alter the balance of nature by increasing the concentration of anaerobic over aerobic species.

== See also ==
- Oxygen deficiency
