= Lotte Pusch =

German chemist (1890–1983)

Lotte Pusch was born on 7 August 1890 in Reichenbach/O.L. and was a German physical chemist. She was of the Protestant denomination. Her father was a District Court Director.

== Education ==
Pusch visited secondary schools in Pleß, Glogau (now Głogów, Poland), and Görlitz before deciding to attend the Mädchen-Realgymnasium Chamissoschule school in Schönberg. She later attended the Friedrich-Wilhelms-Universität (later the Humboldt University of Berlin). During her first two semesters, she focused on mathematics, physics, and chemistry. In 1913, Pusch passed her university exams and began to study for her Ph.D. in physical chemistry. She earned her doctorate in March 1916 after passing her doctoral exam on January 20, 1916.

== Career ==
Upon receipt of her doctorate, Pusch, in the summer semester of 1916, became the only female Assistent (assistant) at the Physikalisch-Chemischen Institut at the Friedrich-Wilhelms-Universität. She was hired in as a civil servant based upon Article 128 in the Weimar Constitution, which is listed as abolishing discriminatory regulations against women civil servants. During this time, Lotte worked with Walther Nernst in regards to the Photo-Induced Chain Reaction of Chlorine and Hydrogen. They looked to find the mechanism for why this reactions is able to produce a large quantum yield. She held the position until 1920. By law, as a civil servant, she was required to relinquish her position to a returning man, in this case Dr. Kurt Bennwitz. In addition, she gave up her career in favor of her husband, the physical chemist Max Volmer.

== Personal ==
Lotte and Max knew and socialized with the physicist Lise Meitner and the chemist Otto Hahn from the 1920s onwards. Lotte also documented some of these conversations between Lise and Max.

== Selected literature ==
- Lotte Pusch Über die Zeitreaktion bei der Neutralisation der Kohlensäure und die wahre Dissoziationskonstante der Kohlensäure PhD thesis, Universität, Berlin, 1916. 37 pp. (29 March 1916)
- Lotte Pusch Über die Zeitreaktion bei der Neutralisation der Kohlensäure und die wahre Dissoziationskonstante der Kohlensäure, Zeitsch. Elektrochem. Volume 22, Issues 11/12, 206–212 (1916)
- Lotte Pusch Nachtrag zu meiner Arbeit: Über die Zeitreaktion bei der Neutralisation der Kohlensäure und die wahre Dissoziationskonstante der Kohlenäure, Zeitsch. Elektrochem. Volume 22, Issues 15/16, 293 (1916)
- Lotte Pusch Zur Anwendung des Einsteinschen photochemischen Äquivalentgesetzes. II., Zeitsch. Elektrochem. Volume 24, 336 – 339 (1918)

== Bibliography ==
- Schmitt, Ulrich T. "Walther Nernst." Memorial. Physicochemical Institute University of Göttingen, 9 Dec. 1999. Web. 15 Mar. 2016. <http://www.nernst.de/>.
- Sime, Ruth Lewin Lise Meitner: A Life in Physics (University of California, First Paperback Edition, 1997)
- Vogt, Annette Aufbruch und Verdrängung. Wissenschaftlerinnen an der Berliner Universität zwischen 1918 und 1945/46, 21-48 in Frauen an der Humboldt-Universität 1908–1998 Volume 99 (Humboldt-Universität zu Berlin, 1998)
- Weimar Constitution. Art. 128-131, Sec. 2
