= Optode =

Optical sensor device to measure a specific substance

An optode or optrode is an optical sensor device that optically measures a specific substance usually with the aid of a chemical transducer.

== Construction ==
An optode requires three components to function: a chemical that responds to an analyte, a polymer to immobilise the chemical transducer and instrumentation (optical fibre, light source, detector and other electronics). Optodes usually have the polymer matrix coated onto the tip of an optical fibre, but in the case of evanescent wave optodes the polymer is coated on a section of fibre that has been unsheathed.

== Operation ==
Optodes can apply various optical measurement schemes such as reflection, absorption, evanescent wave, luminescence (fluorescence and phosphorescences), chemiluminescence, surface plasmon resonance. By far the most popular methodology is luminescence.

Luminescence in solution obeys the linear Stern–Volmer relationship. Fluorescence of a molecule is quenched by specific analytes, e.g., ruthenium complexes are quenched by oxygen. When a fluorophore is immobilised within a polymer matrix myriad micro-environments are created. The micro-environments reflect varying diffusion co-efficients for the analyte. This leads to a non-linear relationship between the fluorescence and the quencher (analyte). This relationship is modelled in various ways, the most popular model is the two site model created by James Demas (University of Virginia).

The signal (fluorescence) to oxygen ratio is not linear, and an optode is most sensitive at low oxygen concentration, i.e., the sensitivity decreases as oxygen concentration increases. The optode sensors can however work in the whole region 0–100% oxygen saturation in water, and the calibration is done the same way as with the Clark type sensor. No oxygen is consumed and hence the sensor is stirring insensitive, but the signal will stabilize more quickly if the sensor is stirred after being put into the sample.

== Popularity ==
Optical sensors are growing in popularity due to the low-cost, low power requirements and long term stability. They provide viable alternatives to electrode-based sensors or more complicated analytical instrumentation, especially in the field of environmental monitoring although in the case of oxygen optrodes, they do not have the resolution as the most recent cathodic microsensors.

== See also ==
- Oxygen sensor
