= Advanced oxidation process =

Chemical treatment procedures

Advanced oxidation processes (AOPs), in a broad sense, are a set of chemical treatment procedures designed to remove organic (and sometimes inorganic) materials in water and wastewater by oxidation through reactions with hydroxyl radicals (·OH). In practice within wastewater treatment, groundwater remediation and domestic water treatment, this term usually refers more specifically to a subset of such chemical processes that employ ozone (O_{3}), hydrogen peroxide (H_{2}O_{2}) and UV light or a combination of the few processes. Common AOP configurations often include Fenton and photo-Fenton systems, in addition to ozone/UV, TiO_{2}/UV photocatalysis, peroxone (hydrogen peroxide and ozone) and Electro-Fenton systems.

== Description ==
AOPs rely on in-situ production of highly reactive hydroxyl radicals (·OH) or other oxidative species for oxidation of contaminant. These reactive species can be applied in water and can oxidize virtually any compound present in the water matrix, often at a diffusion-controlled reaction speed. Consequently, ·OH reacts unselectively once formed and contaminants will be quickly and efficiently fragmented and converted into small inorganic molecules. Hydroxyl radicals are produced with the help of one or more primary oxidants (e.g. ozone, hydrogen peroxide, oxygen) and/or energy sources (e.g. ultraviolet light) or catalysts (e.g. titanium dioxide). Precise, pre-programmed dosages, sequences and combinations of these reagents are applied in order to obtain a maximum •OH yield. Researchers are also exploring doped metal-oxide catalysts and carbon-based materials to boost radical yields and broaden pH operating windows. In general, when applied in properly tuned conditions, AOPs can reduce the concentration of contaminants from several-hundreds ppm to less than 5 ppb and therefore significantly bring COD and TOC down, which earned it the credit of being one of the most effective "water treatment processes of the 21st century". Current research also focuses on reducing energy demand and minimizing byproducts produced during the process—such as bromate—to improve the viability of AOP implementation in different industries.

The AOP procedure is particularly useful for cleaning biologically toxic or non-degradable materials such as aromatics, pesticides, petroleum constituents, and volatile organic compounds in wastewater. Additionally, AOPs can be used to treat effluent of secondary treated wastewater which is then called tertiary treatment. The contaminant materials are largely converted into stable inorganic compounds such as water, carbon dioxide and salts, i.e. they undergo mineralization. A goal of the wastewater purification by means of AOP procedures is the reduction of the chemical contaminants and the toxicity to such an extent that the cleaned wastewater may be reintroduced into receiving streams or, at least, into a conventional sewage treatment.

Although oxidation processes involving ·OH have been in use since late 19th century (such as Fenton's reagent, which was used as an analytical reagent at that time), the utilization of such oxidative species in water treatment did not receive adequate attention until Glaze et al. suggested the possible generation of ·OH "in sufficient quantity to affect water purification" and defined the term "Advanced Oxidation Processes" for the first time in 1987. AOPs still have not been put into commercial use on a large scale (especially in developing countries) even up to today mostly because of relatively high associated costs. Nevertheless, its high oxidative capability and efficiency make AOPs a popular technique in tertiary treatment in which the most recalcitrant organic and inorganic contaminants are to be eliminated. The increasing interest in water reuse and more stringent regulations regarding water pollution are currently accelerating the implementation of AOPs at full-scale. There are roughly 500 commercialized AOP installations around the world at present, mostly in Europe and the United States. Other countries like China are showing increasing interests in AOPs.

The reaction, using H_{2}O_{2} for the formation of ·OH, is carried out in an acidic medium (2.5-4.5 pH) and a low temperature (30 °C - 50 °C), in a safe and efficient way, using optimized catalyst and hydrogen peroxide formulations.

== Chemical principles ==
Generally speaking, chemistry in AOPs could be essentially divided into three parts:

1. Formation of ·OH;
2. Initial attacks on target molecules by ·OH and their breakdown to fragments;
3. Subsequent attacks by ·OH until ultimate mineralization.

The mechanism of ·OH production (Part 1) highly depends on the sort of AOP technique that is used. For example, ozonation, UV/H_{2}O_{2,} photocatalytic oxidation, peroxone (H_{2}O_{2} / O_{3}) and Fenton's oxidation rely on different mechanisms of ·OH generation:

- UV/H_{2}O_{2}:

H_{2}O_{2} + UV → 2·OH (homolytic bond cleavage of the O-O bond of H_{2}O_{2} leads to formation of 2·OH radicals)

- UV/HOCl:

HOCl + UV → ·OH + Cl·

- Peroxide / Ozone (Peroxone) AOP:

H_{2}O_{2} ↔ HO_{2}^{−} + H^{+} (Partial dissociation of hydrogen peroxide in water)
O_{3} + HO_{2}^{−} → ·OH + O_{2}^{−}· + O_{2}

- Ozone based AOP:

O_{3} + HO^{−} → HO_{2}^{−} + O_{2} (reaction between O_{3} and a hydroxyl ion leads to the formation of H_{2}O_{2} (in charged form))
O_{3} + HO_{2}^{−} → HO_{2}· + O_{3}^{−}· (a second O_{3} molecule reacts with the HO_{2}^{−} to produce the ozonide radical)
O_{3}^{−}· + H^{+} → HO_{3}· (this radical gives to ·OH upon protonation)
HO_{3}· → ·OH + O_{2}
the reaction steps presented here are just a part of the reaction sequence, see reference for more details

- Fenton based AOP:

Fe^{2+} + H_{2}O_{2} → Fe^{3+}+ HO· + OH^{−} (initiation of Fenton's reagent)

Fe^{3+} + H_{2}O_{2} → Fe^{2+}+ HOO· + H^{+} (regeneration of Fe^{2+} catalyst)

H_{2}O_{2} → HO· + HOO· + H_{2}O (Self scavenging and decomposition of H_{2}O_{2})

the reaction steps presented here are just a part of the reaction sequence, see reference for more details

- Photocatalytic oxidation with TiO_{2}:

TiO_{2} + UV → e^{−} + h^{+} (irradiation of the photocatalytic surface leads to an excited electron (e^{−}) and electron gap (h^{+}))
Ti(IV) + H_{2}O ⇌ Ti(IV)-H_{2}O (water adsorbs onto the catalyst surface)
Ti(IV)-H_{2}O + h^{+} ⇌ Ti(IV)-·OH + H^{+} the highly reactive electron gap will react with water
the reaction steps presented here are just a part of the reaction sequence, see reference for more details

Currently there is no consensus on the detailed mechanisms in Part 3, but researchers have cast light on the processes of initial attacks in Part 2. In essence, ·OH is a radical species and should behave like a highly reactive electrophile. Thus two type of initial attacks are supposed to be Hydrogen Abstraction and Addition. The following scheme, adopted from a technical handbook and later refined, describes a possible mechanism of the oxidation of benzene by ·OH.

Scheme 1. Proposed mechanism of the oxidation of benzene by hydroxyl radicals

The first and second steps are electrophilic addition that breaks the aromatic ring in benzene (A) and forms two hydroxyl groups (–OH) in intermediate C. Later an ·OH grabs a hydrogen atom in one of the hydroxyl groups, producing a radical species (D) that is prone to undergo rearrangement to form a more stable radical (E). E, on the other hand, is readily attacked by ·OH and eventually forms 2,4-hexadiene-1,6-dione (F). As long as there are sufficient ·OH radicals, subsequent attacks on compound F will continue until the fragments are all converted into small and stable molecules like H_{2}O and CO_{2} in the end, but such processes may still be subject to a myriad of possible and partially unknown mechanisms.

== Current Use ==
AOPs are currently used frequently for removing contaminants that are resistant to conventional water treatment processes such as 1,4-dioxane and trichloroethene (TCE), referred to as micropollutants when they occur in drinking water.

== Advantages ==
AOPs hold several advantages in the field of water treatment:

- They can effectively eliminate organic compounds in aqueous phase, rather than collecting or transferring pollutants into another phase. Optimized AOPs often also achieve > 99% contamination removal yields, in addition to > 90% mineralization of organic carbon yield which successfully converts pollutants fully to CO_{2} and H_{2}O and other individual elements found within the treatment batch.
- Due to the reactivity of ·OH, it reacts with many aqueous pollutants without discriminating. AOPs are therefore applicable in many, if not all, scenarios where many organic contaminants must be removed at the same time.
- Some heavy metals can also be removed in forms of precipitated M(OH)_{x}.
- In some AOPs designs, disinfection can also be achieved simultaneously with contamination removal which makes these AOPs an integrated solution to some water quality problems that require sanitization.
- Since the complete reduction product of ·OH is H_{2}O, AOPs theoretically do not introduce any new hazardous substances into the water but can produce undesired byproducts if the process is incomplete.

== Current shortcomings ==
AOPs are not perfect and have several drawbacks.

- Most prominently, the cost of AOPs is fairly high priced at US$3–4 million and upwards for 0.42 ML/h production at use in industrial treatment due to specialized materials and high intensity UV or ozone generation required to run the process.
- Some techniques require pre-treatment of wastewater to ensure reliable performance, which could be potentially costly and technically demanding. For instance, presence of bicarbonate ions (HCO_{3}^{−}) can appreciably reduce the concentration of ·OH due to scavenging processes that yield H_{2}O and a much less reactive species, ·CO_{3}^{−}. As a result, bicarbonate must be wiped out from the system or AOPs are compromised and thus require hydroxyl radicals and other reagents proportional to the quantity of contaminants to be removed.
- It is not cost effective to use solely AOPs to handle a large amount of wastewater as the energy cost for operation is substantial at 0.5 kWh/m^{3} and driving catalyst cost of $0.15–0.30 USD per m^{3} but instead AOPs should be deployed in the final stage after primary and secondary treatment which by then would have successfully removed a large proportion of contaminants. Ongoing research also been done to combine AOPs with biological treatment to bring the cost down.
- When used for drinking water, if bromide is present, the use of ozone has the tendency to form bromide, a potential carcinogen. It is critical in drinking water applications for AOP systems to demonstrate the control of bromate.

== Industrial application ==
HiPOx is a trademarked advanced oxidation process system that uses peroxone chemistry to efficiently remove refractory organic pollutants from water.

HiPOx systems have been deployed and studied since 2002 or earlier, and have been used as stand-alone remediation systems or incorporated into specialized water treatment trains that break down various contaminants that are not well treatable by conventional methods, such as MTBE, pharmaceuticals and personal care products (PPCPs), 1,4-dioxane, or for disinfection. This capability is particularly desirable in water reuse applications.

The use of peroxone to generate hydroxyl radicals in water treatment presents a secondary water quality concern in the presence of bromide ion because reaction with ozone results in the generation of the possible carcinogen bromate. While early HiPOx systems did not satisfy regulators' requirements for avoiding the formation of bromate in the treated water product, after further development HiPOx or similar generic systems have demonstrated the capability to control bromate.

== Future ==
Since AOPs were first defined in 1987, the field has witnessed a rapid development both in theory and in application. So far, TiO_{2}/UV systems, H_{2}O_{2}/UV systems, peroxone, Fenton, photo-Fenton and Electro-Fenton systems have received extensive scrutiny. Despite the technological advancements made, there are still many key challenges and obstacles revolving around AOPs. These challenges such as catalyst fouling, energy consumption of UV lamps, large scale reactant distribution within reactors, and control of partial-oxidation by-products all require further research on existing AOPs options to allow for the integration of efficient and advanced AOPs systems.

Modified AOPs promise to be more efficient and economical. Doped TiO_{2} can show enhance the photocatalytic activity; and implementation of ultrasonic treatment could promote the production of hydroxyl radicals. Additionally further efforts to harness visible-light photocatalysts, such as doped graphitic carbon nitride (g-C_{3}N_{4})—aim to reduce reliance on UV sources (lamps, lights, etc.) which typically need replacement every few years. Modified AOPs such as Fluidized-Bed Fenton has also shown great potential in terms of degradation performance and economics.

== See also ==
- List of waste-water treatment technologies
- Fenton reaction
- Electro-oxidation
- In situ chemical oxidation
- Process engineering
- Water purification
