= Asian Conference on Electrochemical Power Sources =

Scientific conference series

The Asian Conference on Electrochemical Power Sources (ACEPS) is a series of scientific conferences focusing on electrochemical power sources that is held in East Asia, Southeast Asia and South Asia at different locations each time. It was initiated by Professor Zempachi Ogumi in Japan in 2006, and has subsequently been held in China (2007), South Korea (2008), Taiwan (2009), Singapore (2010), India (2012), Japan (2013), China (2015), Korea (2017), and Taiwan (2019). The next meeting will be held in Singapore (Postpone to 2022).

== Background ==
The First Asian Conference on Electrochemical Power Sources (ACEPS-1) was held November 15–17, 2006, in Kyoto, Japan, with the aim of strengthening regional research potential and improving infrastructures in the Asian region. ACEPS promotes collaboration and co-operation between Asian scientists in the fields of fuel cells, storage batteries, super capacitors and electrochemical science.

== Conferences ==
Up to now, seven meetings have been held:

- ACEPS-1, November 15–17, 2006, Kyoto, Japan
- ACEPS-2, October 21–23, 2007, Fudan University, Shanghai, China
- ACEPS-3, November, 2008, Korea University, Seoul, South Korea
- ACEPS-4, November 8–12, 2009, National Taiwan University of Science and Technology, Taipei, Taiwan
- ACEPS-5, September 17–20, 2010, Singapore
- ACEPS-6, January 5–8, 2012, Indian Institute of Science and Central Electro Chemical Research Institute, India
- ACEPS-7, November 24–27, 2013, Co-Sponsored by Electrochemical Society of Japan and Chemical Society of Japan,
- ACEPS-8, August 21–25, 2015, Kai Wah Plaza Hotel, Kunming, Co-Sponsored by Fudan University, Shanghai, China,
- ACEPS-9, August 20–23, 2017, Gyeongju, South Korea,
- ACEPS-10, November 24–27, 2019, Kaohsiung, Taiwan,
- ACEPS-11, December 11–14, 2022, National University of Singapore, Singapore
- ACEPS-12, May 19–22, 2024, Osaka International Convention Center, Japan
- ACEPS-13, January 11–14, 2026, Indian Institute of Science, Bengaluru, India
