= Partial current =

In electrochemistry, partial current is defined as the electric current associated with (anodic or cathodic) half of the electrode reaction.

Depending on the electrode half-reaction, one can distinguish two types of partial current:

- cathodic partial current I_{c} (called also cathodic current): is the flow of electrons from the electrode surface to a species in solution;
- anodic partial current I_{a} (called also anodic current): is the flow of electrons into the electrode from a species in solution.

The cathodic and anodic partial currents are defined by IUPAC.

The partial current densities (i_{c} and i_{a}) are the ratios of partial currents respect to the electrode areas (A_{c} and A_{a}):

i_{c} = I_{c}/A_{c}
i_{a} = I_{a}/A_{a}

The sum of the cathodic partial current density i_{c} (positive) and the anodic partial current density i_{a} (negative) gives the net current density i:

i = i_{c} + i_{a}

In the case of the cathodic partial current density being equal to the anodic partial current density (for example, in a corrosion process), the net current density on the electrode is zero:

i_{eq} = i_{c,eq} + i_{a,eq} = 0

When more than one reaction occur on an electrode simultaneously, then the total electrode current can be expressed as:

$$I = \Sigma I_{a,j} + \Sigma I_{c,j}$$

where the index $j$ refers to the particular reactions.

== See also ==
- Exchange current density
