= József Darvas =

Hungarian writer and politician (1912–1973)

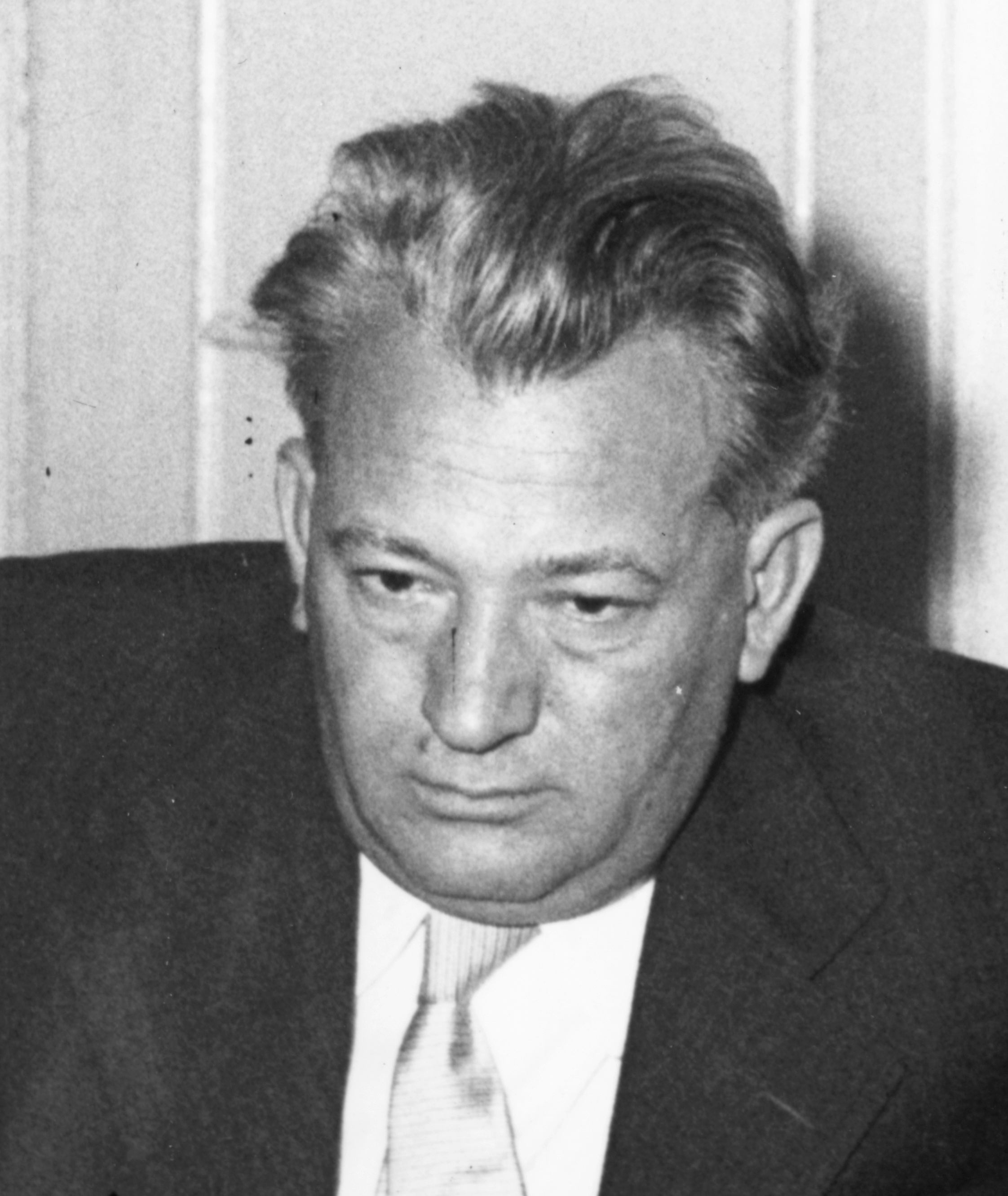

Minister of Religion and Education of Hungary
- In office 25 February 1950 – 19 May 1951
- Preceded by: Gyula Ortutay
- Succeeded by: Himself, as Minister of Education

Minister of Education of Hungary
- In office 19 May 1951 – 4 July 1953
- Preceded by: Himself, as Minister of Religion and Education
- Succeeded by: Tibor Erdey-Grúz

Minister of Culture of Hungary
- In office 4 July 1953 – 27 October 1956
- Preceded by: József Révai
- Succeeded by: György Lukács

Personal details
- Born: József Dumitrás; 10 February 1912 Orosháza, Békés County, Kingdom of Hungary
- Died: 3 December 1973 (aged 61) Budapest, Hungarian People's Republic
- Party: National Peasant Party, MSZMP
- Profession: writer, publicist, politician

József Darvas (born József Dumitrás; 10 February 1912 – 3 December 1973) was a Hungarian writer and politician, who served as Minister of Religion and Education between 1950 and 1951, as Minister of Education between 1951 and 1953 and as Minister of Culture between 1953 and 1956. He was member of the Presidential Council of the People's Republic of Hungary since 1971.

Political offices
Preceded by Gyula Ortutay	Minister of Religion and Education; 1950–1951	Succeeded by post abolished
Preceded by post established	Minister of Education; 1951–1953	Succeeded by Tibor Erdey-Grúz
Preceded by József Révai	Minister of Culture; 1953–1956	Succeeded by György Lukács
