= Tibor Erdey-Grúz =

Hungarian chemist and politician

Minister of Education of Hungary
- In office 4 July 1953 – 30 July 1956
- Preceded by: József Darvas
- Succeeded by: Albert Kónya

Personal details
- Born: 27 October 1902 Budapest, Austria-Hungary
- Died: 16 August 1976 (aged 73) Budapest, People's Republic of Hungary
- Party: MDP
- Profession: chemist, teacher, politician

Tibor Erdey-Grúz (27 October 1902 – 16 August 1976) was a Hungarian chemist and politician, who served as Minister of Higher Education between 1952 and 1953 and after that as Minister of Education from 1953 to 1956.

== See also ==
- Erdey-Grúz–Volmer equation

Political offices
Preceded by post created	Minister of Higher Education; 1952–1953	Succeeded by post abolished
Preceded by József Darvas	Minister of Education; 1953–1956	Succeeded by Albert Kónya
Cultural offices
Preceded by István Rusznyák	President of the Hungarian Academy of Sciences; 1970–1976	Succeeded by János Szentágothai
