= Julius Tafel =

German chemist and electrochemist (1862–1918)

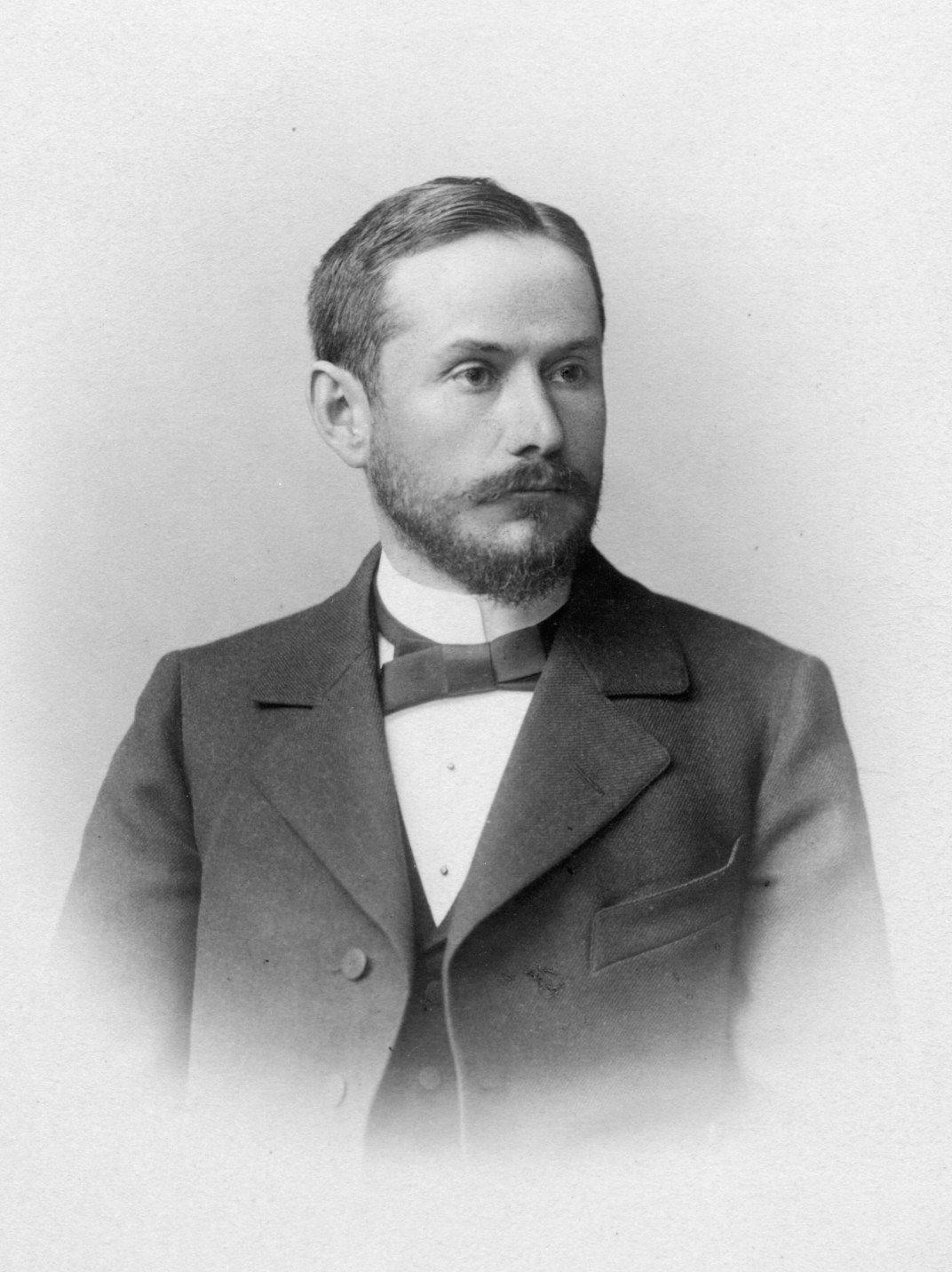
- Julius Tafel
- Born: 2 June 1862; Courrendlin, Switzerland
- Died: 2 September 1918 (aged 56); Munich, German Empire
- Education: Ludwig-Maximilians-Universität München
- Known for: Tafel reaction Tafel equation
- Scientific career
- Fields: Electrochemistry
- Workplaces: Ludwig-Maximilians-Universität München
- Doctoral advisor: Hermann Emil Fischer

Julius Tafel (2 June 1862 – 2 September 1918) was a German chemist and electrochemist.

== Early life and education ==
Julius Tafel was born in the village of Choindez in Courrendlin, Switzerland on 2 June 1862. Tafel's father, Julius Tafel Sr. (1827-1893) studied chemistry at the University of Tübingen and became a director of Von Roll’s iron and steel works located in Choindez in 1856, and then took a top management position in steel works located in Gerlafingen in 1863.

Tafel attended the Realgymnasium in Stuttgart and Nuremberg, then studied chemistry from 1880 at the University of Zurich, the Ludwig-Maximilians-Universität München, and the University of Erlangen. In 1884, he obtained his Ph.D. under Emil Fischer, who had joined the University of Erlangen in 1882. Tafel followed Fischer to the University of Würzburg in 1885 as his private assistant and completed his habilitation in 1888.

== Work ==
He worked first with Emil Fischer on the field of organic chemistry, but changed to electrochemistry after his work with Wilhelm Ostwald. He is known for the discovery of an electrosynthetic rearrangement reaction of various alkylated ethyl acetoacetates to form hydrocarbons, now called the Tafel rearrangement, and the Tafel equation, which relates the rate of an electrochemical reaction to the overpotential. He is also credited for the discovery of the catalytic mechanism of hydrogen evolution (the Tafel mechanism). Tafel retired aged 48 due to ill health but continued to write book reviews until his death.

== Death ==
Tafel suffered from insomnia and eventually had a complete nervous breakdown. He committed suicide in Munich in 1918.
