= John Alfred Valentine Butler =

British electrochemist

- Born: 14 February 1899; Winchcombe, Gloucestershire
- Died: 16 July 1977 (aged 78)
- Known for: Butler–Volmer equation
- Awards: Fellow of the Royal Society
- Scientific career
- Fields: Physical chemistry

John Alfred Valentine Butler (14 February 1899 – 16 July 1977) was an English physical chemist best known for his contributions to the development of electrode kinetics (Butler–Volmer equation).

== Biography ==
John Alfred Valentine Butler (known to his friends and colleagues as J. A. V.) was born into a Cotswolds farming family in Winchcombe on 14 February 1899; he was the eldest of three children of Alfred and Mary Ann (née Powell). After attending the local primary school, he won a scholarship which covered the travelling expenses and fees for Cheltenham Grammar School. Coming from a non-academic family, he had no encouragement to go to university, and so took a short apprenticeship with a local pharmacist. This led to his being drafted into the RAMC towards the end of World War I: after training, he was posted to a field hospital near Ypres. Here, he had the chance for self-study, with the help of books on loan from Lewis's Lending Library in London, and the University Correspondence College, Cambridge. Butler was demobilised in October 1919 and enrolled at University of Birmingham, from where he graduated "BSc with 1st Class Honours in 1921 (1st in the year)." In 1922 he was appointed Assistant Lecturer in the University College of Swansea. His work here led to the publication of his first two books (see Works).

Butler's next appointment was in 1926 as lecturer in chemistry in the University of Edinburgh, under Sir James Walker, where he studied the behaviour of electrolytes in mixed solvents, on which he published a series of papers in the Proceedings of the Royal Society (A) with five different collaborators from 1929 to 1933. A wide range of other papers appeared during this productive phase. Productive but not financially rewarding: he found it difficult to support his family on his Lecturer's stipend. In 1939 he was appointed to work at the Rockefeller Institute for Medical Research, Princeton and so at the end of August the family sailed on the Queen Mary to New York. Butler worked in J H Northrop's group on the homogeneity of crystallised enzymes.

After the outbreak of WWII, Butler offered his services and was appointed Executive Officer at the British Central Scientific Office in Washington, DC, which had a staff of 17 officers, under the direction of Sir Charles Galton Darwin, a grandson of Charles Darwin. He continued in that role until 1944, when Edinburgh asked him to return to teaching there. But he did not find the conditions "at all congenial", and so he secured an appointment in 1946 at the Courtauld Institute of Biochemistry under Professor (later Sir) Charles Dodds, where he worked on the proteolytic degradation of insulin. This work was not altogether successful, in part because of the great strides made by Sanger. So, in 1949, Butler moved to the Chester Beatty Research Institute in Chelsea, directed by Alexander Haddow. There were two main themes to his work at the Chester Beatty, one of which – on the proteins associated with DNA in the structure of chromosomes, the histones – is especially associated with Butler.

=== Family ===
In 1929, Butler married Margaret Lois Hope, a botanist and Cambridge graduate, at Haddington, East Lothian. They had three children, all successful in their respective fields of biological and medical sciences. From 1949 to 1977, the Butler's lived in Rickmansworth in a house then known as Nightingale Corner, which had previously belonged to Hubert J. Foss, first Musical Editor (1923–1941) for Oxford University Press. Like the Fosses, the Butlers often entertained guests there.

J. A. V. died on 16 July 1977

== Awards ==
He was awarded the Meldola Medal and Prize in 1928 by the Royal Institute of Chemistry.

In 1956, he was elected a Fellow of the Royal Society. His candidacy citation read:

"Dr. Butler's main activities have been firstly in thermodynamics and in electrochemistry and secondly the application of physical chemistry to biologically important substances and their reactions. First of all, he developed kinetic theories of the origin of electrode potentials; he examined the thermodynamic properties of salts, particularly in mixed solvents; he studied the thermodynamics of surfaces of solutions and developed the general theory of overpotential with hydrogen and oxygen electrodes. Thermodynamically, he studied the free energy and entropy of hydration of organic substances and discovered a general relation between heat and entropy of solution. In addition, he studied acid and base catalysed reactions in 'heavy water' and some molecular kinetics of enzyme action. Latterly he has been engaged in studies of the physical chemistry of biologically important substances, including the action of proteolytic enzymes on insulin; the action of radiomimetic substances, and of X-rays on deoxyribonucleic acid."

== Works ==
- The Chemical Elements and their Compounds (Macmillan, 1927)
- The Fundamentals of Chemical Thermodynamics (Macmillan, 1928)
- Man is a Microcosm (The Scientific Book Club, UK, 1950)
- Electrical Phenomena at Interfaces, in Chemistry, Physics and Biology (Methuen, 1951)
- Inside the Living Cell - some Secrets of Life (The Scientific Book Club, UK, 1957)
- Science and Human Life: Successes and Limitations (Pergamon, 1957)
- Gene Control in the Living Cell (Allen & Unwin, 1968)
- The Life Process (Allen & Unwin, 1970)
- Modern Biology and Its Human Implications (Hodder and Stoughton, 1976)
