= Faradaic current =

Electric current generated by a redox reaction at an electrode

In electrochemistry, the faradaic current is the electric current generated by the reduction or oxidation of some chemical substance at an electrode (i.e. by the redox reaction between a substance and an electrode). The net faradaic current is the algebraic sum of all the faradaic currents flowing through an indicator electrode or working electrode.

== Limiting current ==
The limiting current in electrochemistry is the limiting value of a faradaic current, which is approached as the rate of charge transfer to an electrode is increased. It can be approached by increasing the electric potential of the electrode or decreasing the rate of mass transfer to the electrode. It is independent of the applied potential over a finite range, and is usually evaluated by subtracting the appropriate residual current from the measured total current. A limiting current can have the character of an adsorption, catalytic, diffusion, or kinetic current, and may include a migration current.

== Migration current ==
The migration current is the difference—for any particular value of the indicator or working electrode potential and any ionic electroactive substance—between:

- the current that would be obtained if there were no transport of the substance due to the electric field between the electrodes, and
- the current that is actually obtained for the reduction or oxidation of the substance.

Following the sign convention for current, the migration current is negative for the reduction of a cation or for the oxidation of an anion, and positive for the oxidation of a cation or the reduction of an anion. Hence, the migration current may tend to either increase or decrease the total current observed.

The migration current approaches zero as the transport number of the electroactive substance is decreased. This is achieved by increasing the concentration of the supporting electrolyte, and hence the conductivity.

== See also ==
- Butler–Volmer equation
- Gas diffusion electrode
