= Overpotential =

Difference between a redox reaction's reduction potential and actual potential

In electrochemistry, overpotential is the potential difference (voltage) between a half-reaction's thermodynamically determined reduction potential and the potential at which the redox event is experimentally observed. The term is directly related to a cell's voltage efficiency. In an electrolytic cell the existence of overpotential implies that the cell requires more energy than thermodynamically expected to drive a reaction. In a galvanic cell the existence of overpotential means less energy is recovered than thermodynamics predicts. In each case the extra/missing energy is lost as heat. The quantity of overpotential is specific to each cell design and varies across cells and operational conditions, even for the same reaction. Overpotential is experimentally determined by measuring the potential at which a given current density (typically small) is achieved.

== Thermodynamics ==
The four possible polarities of overpotentials are listed below.

- An electrolytic cell's anode is more positive, using more energy than thermodynamics require.
- An electrolytic cell's cathode is more negative, using more energy than thermodynamics require.
- A galvanic cell's anode is less negative, supplying less energy than thermodynamically possible.
- A galvanic cell's cathode is less positive, supplying less energy than thermodynamically possible.

The overpotential increases with growing current density (or rate), as described by the Tafel equation. An electrochemical reaction is a combination of two half-cells and multiple elementary steps. Each step is associated with multiple forms of overpotential. The overall overpotential is the summation of many individual losses.

Voltage efficiency describes the fraction of energy lost through overpotential. For an electrolytic cell this is the ratio of a cell's thermodynamic potential divided by the cell's experimental potential converted to a percentile. For a galvanic cell it is the ratio of a cell's experimental potential divided by the cell's thermodynamic potential converted to a percentile. Voltage efficiency should not be confused with Faraday efficiency. Both terms refer to a mode through which electrochemical systems can lose energy. Energy can be expressed as the product of potential, current and time (joule = volt × Ampere × second). Losses in the potential term through overpotentials are described by voltage efficiency. Losses in the current term through misdirected electrons (towards undesired sidereactions) are described by Faradaic efficiency.

== Varieties ==
Overpotential can be divided into many different subcategories that are not all well-defined. For example, "polarization overpotential" can refer to the electrode polarization and the hysteresis found in forward and reverse peaks of cyclic voltammetry. A likely reason for the lack of strict definitions is that it is difficult to determine how much of a measured overpotential is derived from a specific source. Overpotentials can be grouped into three categories: activation, concentration, and resistance.

=== Activation overpotential ===
Activation overpotential for the evolution of hydrogen, oxygen and chlorine on various electrode materials at 25 °C. The overpotential here measures the activation overpotential at a current density of 1 mA/cm ^{2} and room temperature.
Electrode Material	Hydrogen	Oxygen	Chlorine
Silver	−0.59 V	+0.61 V	
Aluminium	−0.58 V		
Gold	−0.12 V	+0.96 V	
Beryllium	−0.63 V		
Bismuth	−0.33 V		
Cadmium	−0.99 V	+0.80 V	
Cobalt	−0.35 V	+0.39 V	
Copper	−0.50 V	+0.58 V	
Iron	−0.40 V	+0.41 V	
Gallium	−0.63 V		
Mercury	−1.04 V		
Indium	−0.80 V		
Molybdenum	−0.24 V		
Niobium	−0.65 V		
Nickel	−0.32 V	+0.61 V	
Lead	−0.88 V	+0.80 V	
Palladium	−0.09 V	+0.89 V	
Platinum	−0.09 V	+1.11 V	+0.10 V
Platinum (platinized)	−0.01 V	+0.46 V	+0.08 V
Stainless Steel	−0.42 V	+0.28 V	
Graphite	−0.47 V	+0.50 V	+0.12 V

The activation overpotential is the potential difference above the equilibrium value required to produce a current that depends on the activation energy of the redox event. While ambiguous, "activation overpotential" also refers to the activation energy necessary to transfer an electron from an electrode to an anolyte. This sort of overpotential can also be called "electron transfer overpotential" and is a component of "polarization overpotential", a phenomenon observed in cyclic voltammetry and partially described by the Cottrell equation.

==== Reaction overpotential ====
Reaction overpotential is an activation overpotential that specifically relates to chemical reactions that precede electron transfer. When the reaction rate and current magnitude increases, a thicker electrical double layer is formed near the electrode surface, and an additional potential is needed to drive the reaction. The faster the reaction, the higher this overpotential. Reaction overpotential can be reduced or eliminated with the use of electrocatalysts. The electrochemical reaction rate and related current density is dictated by the kinetics of the electrocatalyst and substrate concentration.

The platinum electrode common to much of electrochemistry is electrocatalytically involved in many reactions. For example, hydrogen is oxidized and protons are reduced readily at the platinum surface of a standard hydrogen electrode in aqueous solution, in a hydrogen evolution reaction. Substituting an electrocatalytically inert glassy carbon electrode for the platinum electrode produces irreversible reduction and oxidation peaks with large overpotentials.

=== Concentration overpotential ===
Concentration overpotential spans a variety of phenomena that involve the depletion of charge-carriers at the electrode surface. Bubble overpotential is a specific form of concentration overpotential in which the concentration of charge-carriers is depleted by the formation of a physical bubble. The "diffusion overpotential" can refer to a concentration overpotential created by slow diffusion rates as well as "polarization overpotential", whose overpotential is derived mostly from activation overpotential but whose peak current is limited by diffusion of analyte.

The potential difference is caused by differences in the concentration of charge-carriers between bulk solution and the electrode surface. It occurs when electrochemical reaction is sufficiently rapid to lower the surface concentration of the charge-carriers below that of bulk solution. The rate of reaction is then dependent on the ability of the charge-carriers to reach the electrode surface.

==== Bubble overpotential ====
Bubble overpotential is a specific form of concentration overpotential and is due to the evolution of gas at either the anode or cathode. This reduces the effective area for current and increases the local current density. An example is the electrolysis of an aqueous sodium chloride solution—although oxygen should be produced at the anode based on its potential, bubble overpotential causes chlorine to be produced instead, which allows the easy industrial production of chlorine and sodium hydroxide by electrolysis.

=== Resistance overpotential ===
Resistance overpotentials are those tied to a cell design. These include "junction overpotentials" that occur at electrode surfaces and interfaces like electrolyte membranes. They can also include aspects of electrolyte diffusion, surface polarization (capacitance) and other sources of counter electromotive forces.

== See also ==
- Electrolysis
- Electrosynthesis
