= Ellingham =

Ellingham may refer to:

== Placenames ==
- Ellingham, Hampshire, England
  - part of Ellingham, Harbridge and Ibsley civil parish
  - Ellingham Priory
- Ellingham, Norfolk, England
  - Ellingham Hall, Norfolk
  - Ellingham railway station
- Ellingham, Northumberland, England
  - Ellingham Hall, Northumberland
- Great Ellingham, Norfolk
- Little Ellingham, Norfolk

== Surname ==
=== Real people ===
- Harold Ellingham (1897–1975), British physical chemist

=== Fictional people ===
- Dr Martin Ellingham, protagonist of the TV series Doc Martin
  - Louisa Ellingham (née Glasson), Martin's wife in the series
  - Ruth Ellingham, Martin's aunt in the series

== See also ==
- Ellingham diagram
- Ellingham–Horton graph
