= Frost diagram =

Graph showing the free energy vs oxidation state of a chemical species

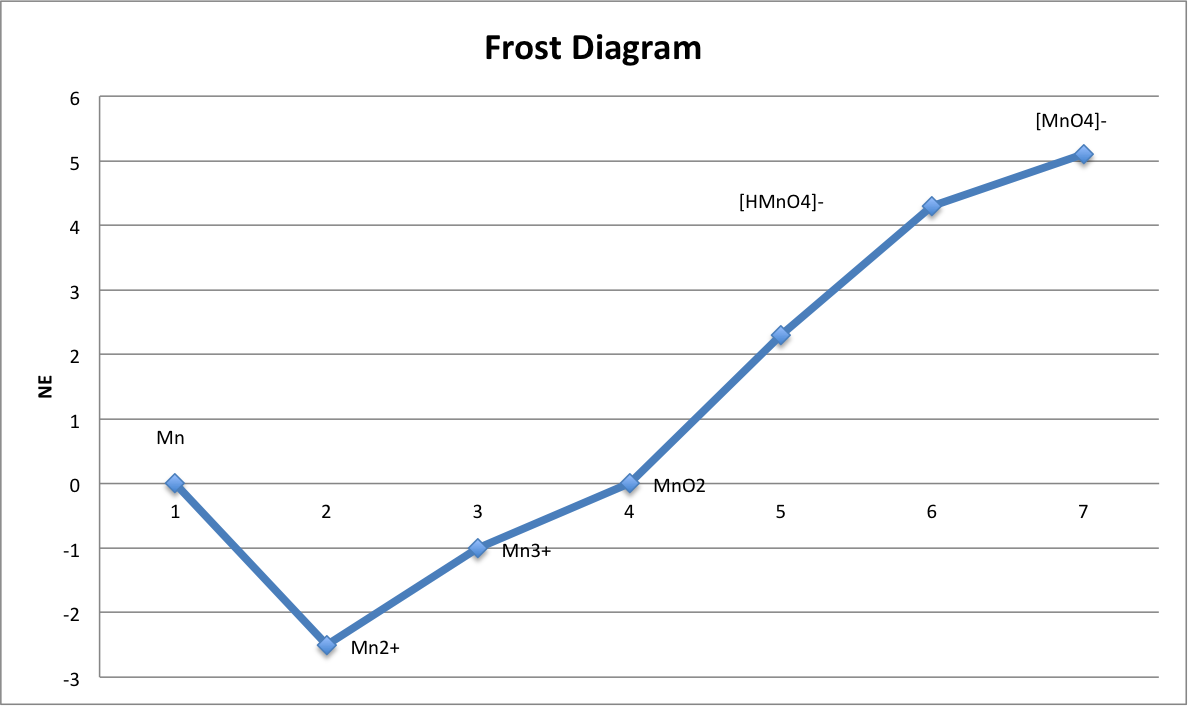
Example of Frost diagram for the manganese species

A Frost diagram or Frost–Ebsworth diagram is a type of graph used by inorganic chemists in electrochemistry to illustrate the relative stability of a number of different oxidation states of a particular substance. The graph illustrates the free energy vs oxidation state of a chemical species. This effect is dependent on pH, so this parameter also must be included. The free energy is determined by the oxidation–reduction half-reactions. The Frost diagram allows easier comprehension of these reduction potentials than the earlier-designed Latimer diagram, because the “lack of additivity of potentials” was confusing. The free energy ΔG° is related to the standard electrode potential E° shown in the graph by the formula ΔG° = −nFE° or nE° = −ΔG°/F, where n is the number of transferred electrons, and F is the Faraday constant (F ≈ 96,485 coulomb/(mol e^{-})). The Frost diagram is named after Arthur Atwater Frost, who originally invented it as a way to "show both free energy and oxidation potential data conveniently" in a 1951 paper.

== X,Y axes of the Frost diagram ==
The Frost diagram shows on its x axis the oxidation state of the species in question, and on its y axis the difference in Gibbs free energy, ΔG°, of the reduction half-reaction of the species multiplied by the sign minus and divided by the Faraday constant, F.

The term -ΔG°/F = nE° represents the n electrons exchanged in the reduction reaction multiplied by the standard potential, E°, expressed in volts.

== Unit and scale ==
The standard free-energy scale is measured in electron-volts, and the nE° = 0 value is usually the neutral species of the pure element. The Frost diagram normally shows free-energy values above and below nE° = 0 and is scaled in integers. The y axis of the graph displays the free energy. Increasing stability (lower free energy) is lower on the graph, so the higher free energy and higher on the graph a species of an element is, the more unstable and reactive it is.

The oxidation state (sometimes also called oxidation number as on the x axis of two illustrating figures on this page) of the species is shown on the x axis of the Frost diagram. Oxidation states are unitless and are also scaled in positive and negative integers. Most often, the Frost diagram displays oxidation state in increasing order, but in some cases it is displayed in decreasing order. The neutral species of the pure element with a free energy of zero (nE° = 0) also has an oxidation state equal to zero. However, the energy of some allotropes may not be zero.

The slope of the line therefore represents the standard potential between two oxidation states. In other words, the steepness of the line shows the tendency for those two reactants to react and to form the lowest-energy product. There is a possibility of having either a positive or a negative slope. A positive slope between two species indicates a tendency for an oxidation reaction, while a negative slope between two species indicates a tendency for reduction. For example, if the manganese in HMnO_{4}^{−} has an oxidation state of +6 and nE° = 4, and in MnO_{2} the oxidation state is +4 and nE° = 0, then the slope Δy/Δx is 4/2 = 2, yielding a standard potential of +2. The stability of any terms can be similarly found by this graph.

== Species thermodynamical stability indicated by peaks and dips ==
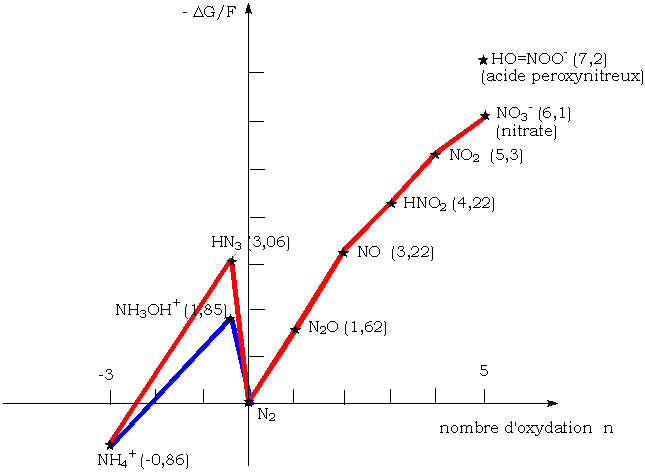
Frost diagram for nitrogen species at pH = 0 illustrating the instability of the azide species (N_{3}^{−}, here protonated as HN_{3}) and hydroxylamine (NH_{2}OH / NH_{3}OH^{+}) and their spontaneous trend to disproportionation. Note: as not all chemical species are necessarily indicated on a given Frost diagram, these diagrams can easily exhibit significant differences: e.g., this diagram does not show hydrazine (NH_{2}−NH_{2}), also a quite unstable compound and the next Frost diagram for nitrogen, here below, does not present the azide species.

The slope of the line between any two points on a Frost diagram gives the standard reduction potential, E°, for the corresponding half-reaction.

On the Frost diagram for nitrogen here below, the slope of the straight line between N_{2} (at the origin of the plot) and nitrite (HNO_{2} / NO_{2}^{−}) being slightly more pronounced than for nitrate, indicates that nitrite is a stronger oxidant than nitrate (NO_{3}^{−}).

This is confirmed by the values of E° determined for their respective half-reactions of reduction towards gaseous N_{2}:

2 HNO_{2} + 6 H^{+} + 6 e^{−} ⇌ N_{2} + 4 H_{2}O (E° = 1.455 V, ∆G° = –842 kJ/mol)

2 NO_{3}^{−} + 12 H^{+} + 10 e^{−} ⇌ N_{2} + 6 H_{2}O (E° = 1.250 V, ∆G° = –1 206 kJ/mol)

Although nitrous acid is located above nitrate in the redox scale and so is a stronger oxidant than nitrate, the Gibbs free energy of the half-reaction for nitrate reduction is more important (∆G° < 0 indicates an exothermic reaction releasing energy) because of the larger number (n) of electrons transferred in the half-reaction (10 versus 6).

A species located above the line between two surrounding species (thus shown at the top of a peak), is unstable and prone to disproportionation (↙↘), while a species located below the line joining two surrounding species (thus shown in a dip) lies in a thermodynamic sink, and is intrinsically stable, giving rise to comproportionation (↘↙).

On the Frost diagram for nitrogen, hydrazoic acid (HN_{3} / N_{3}^{−}) and hydroxylamine (NH_{2}OH_{2}^{+} / NH_{2}OH) are both located at the top of a peak and so can easily disproportionate towards the two more stable surrounding species: ammonium (NH_{4}^{+}) and molecular nitrogen (N_{2}). So, in aqueous solution:

– under acidic conditions, hydrazoic acid disproportionates as:
9 HN_{3} + 3 H^{+} → 12 N_{2} + 3 NH_{4}^{+}

– under neutral, or basic, conditions, the azide anion disproportionates as:
9 N_{3}^{−} + 9 H_{2}O → 12 N_{2} + 3 NH_{3} + 9 OH^{−}

== Disproportionation and comproportionation ==
In regards to electrochemical reactions, two main types of reactions can be visualized using the Frost diagram. Comproportionation is when two equivalents of an element, differing in oxidation state, combine to form a product with an intermediate oxidation state. Disproportionation is the opposite reaction, in which two equivalents of an element, identical in oxidation state, react to form two products with differing oxidation states.

Disproportionation: 2 M^{n}^{+} → M^{m+} + M^{p+}.

Comproportionation: M^{m+} + M^{p+} → 2 M^{n}^{+}.

2 n = m + p in both examples.

Using a Frost diagram, one can predict whether one oxidation state would undergo disproportionation, or two oxidation states would undergo comproportionation. Looking at two slopes among a set of three oxidation states on the diagram, assuming the two standard potentials (slopes) are not equal, the middle oxidation state will either be in a “hill” or in a “valley” shape. A hill is formed when the left slope is steeper than the right, and a valley is formed when the right slope is steeper than the left. An oxidation state that is on “top of the hill” tends to favor disproportionation into the adjacent oxidation states. The adjacent oxidation states, however, will favor comproportionation if the middle oxidation state is in the “bottom of a valley”. By Jensen's inequality, drawing the line between the oxidation state to the left and the one to the right and seeing if the species lies above or below this line is a quick way to determine concavity/convexity (concavity would indicate comproportionation, for example).

== pH dependence ==
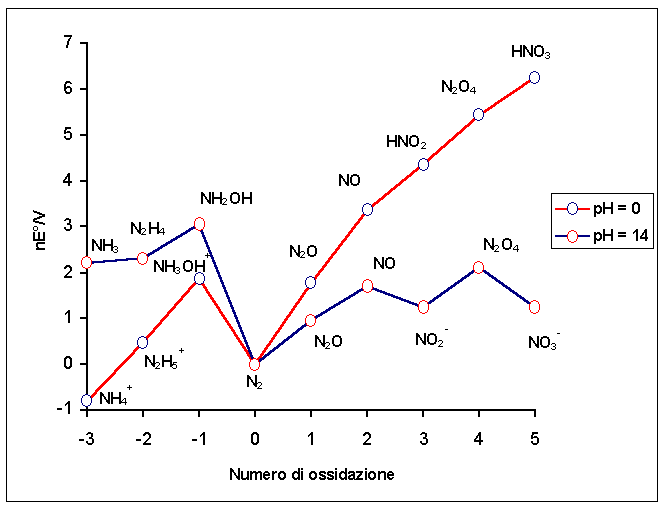
Frost diagram for nitrogen at two extreme pH values (0 and 14). Note: This Frost diagram for nitrogen is also incomplete as it lacks azide (N_{3}^{−}, or hydrazoic acid, HN_{3}), presented here above in the former Frost diagram for nitrogen.

The pH dependence is given by the factor −0.059m/n per pH unit, where m relates to the number of protons in the equation, and n the number of electrons exchanged. Electrons are always exchanged in electrochemistry, but not necessarily protons. If there is no proton exchange in the reaction equilibrium, the reaction is said to be pH-independent. This means that the values for the electrochemical potential rendered in a redox half-reaction, whereby the elements in question change oxidation states are the same whatever the pH conditions under which the procedure is carried out.

The Frost diagram is also a useful tool for comparing the trends of standard potentials (slope) of acidic and basic solutions. The pure, neutral element transitions to different compounds depending whether the species is in acidic and basic pHs. Though the value and amount of oxidation states remain unchanged, the free energies can vary greatly. The Frost diagram allows the superimposition of acidic and basic graphs for easy and convenient comparison.

== Possible confusion related to non-standard conventions / pH used in textbooks ==
Arthur Frost stated in his own original publication that there may be potential criticism for his Frost diagram. He predicts that “the slopes may not be as easily or accurately recognized as they are the direct numerical values of the oxidation potentials [of the Latimer diagram]”. Many inorganic chemists use both the Latimer and Frost diagrams in tandem, using the Latimer for quantitative data, and then converting those data into a Frost diagram for visualization. Frost suggested that the numerical values of standard potentials could be added next to the slopes to provide supplemental information.

Another pitfall is that the pH conditions (acid or basic) considered to construct the diagrams are often left unstated, even though redox potential depends on pH. Frost diagrams nE° = −ΔG°/F, classically constructed with the standard potential E°, implicitly refers to acid conditions ([ H^{+}] = 1 M, pH = 0).
However, in some textbooks the Frost diagram of an element may be confusing for the reader, because the redox potential depends on pH and some notations, or conventions, may differ from the standard conditions and be unclear.

Because H^{+} ions participate into redox reactions to balance acid–base reactions related to the O^{2−} anions released in solution during reduction, or at the contrary consumed by oxidation reactions, according to Le Chatelier's principle, the oxidizing power of oxidizing agents is exacerbated under acidic conditions (2 H^{+} + O^{2−} ⇌ H_{2}O) while the reducing power of reducing agents is exacerbated under basic conditions (2 OH^{−} ⇌ O^{2−} + H_{2}O).

Some textbooks present the reduction potentials calculated under standard conditions, so with [ H^{+}] = 1 M (pH = 0, acid-solution), E° (2 H^{+} + 2 e^{−} ⇌ H_{2}), while also discussing redox processes occurring in a basic-solution. To attempt to overcome the problem, in the Phillips and Williams Inorganic Chemistry textbook, however, the reduction potentials for basic solutions are calculated with non-standard conditions and unusual conventions ([ OH^{−}] = 1 M, pH = 14) according to the following formula:

E°_{(OH)} = E°_{(pH 14)} = E°_{basic} − E° (2 H_{2}O + 2 e^{−} ⇌ H_{2} + 2 OH^{−}) = E°_{basic} + 0.828 V.

So, to avoid confusion for the reader, it is important to use clear conventions and notations, and to also systematically indicate the pH value (0 or 14) for which the Frost diagrams have been constructed, or even better, to present both curves (for pH 0 and 14) on the same diagram to put in evidence the effect of pH on the redox equilibrium.

== See also ==
- Pourbaix diagram
- Ellingham diagram
