= Latimer diagram =

Representation of the standard electrode potential data of an element

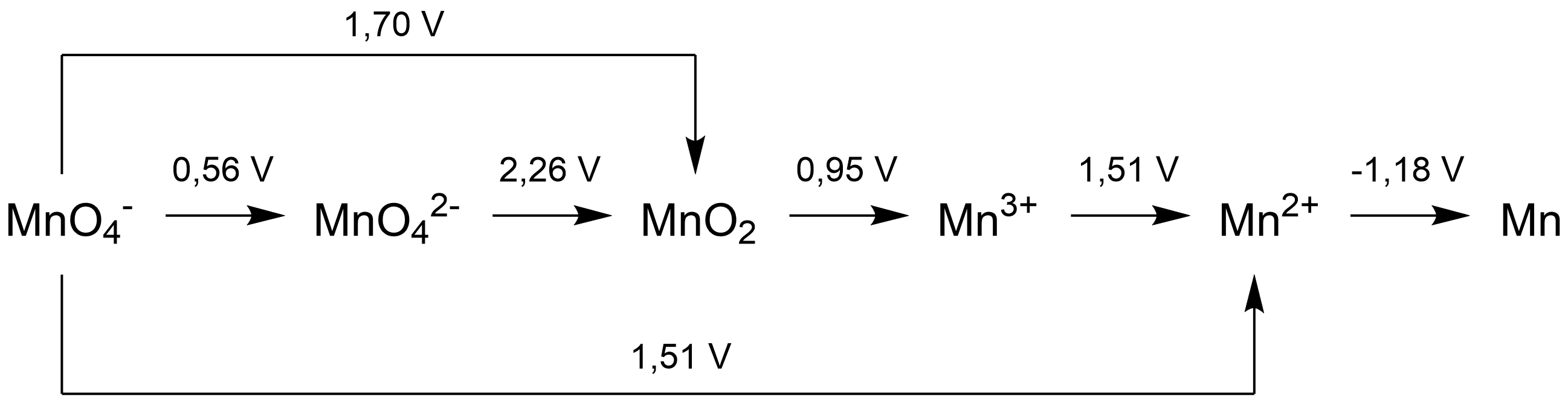
Latimer diagram of manganese

A Latimer diagram of a chemical element is a summary of the standard electrode potential data of that element. This type of diagram is named after Wendell Mitchell Latimer (1893–1955), an American chemist.

== Construction ==
In a Latimer diagram, because by convention redox reactions are shown in the direction of reduction (gain of electrons), the most highly oxidized form of the element is on the left side, with successively lower oxidation states to the right side. The species are connected by arrows, and the numerical value of the standard potential (in volts) for the reduction is written at each arrow. For example, for oxygen, the species would be in the order O_{2} (0), H_{2}O_{2} (–1), H_{2}O (-2):

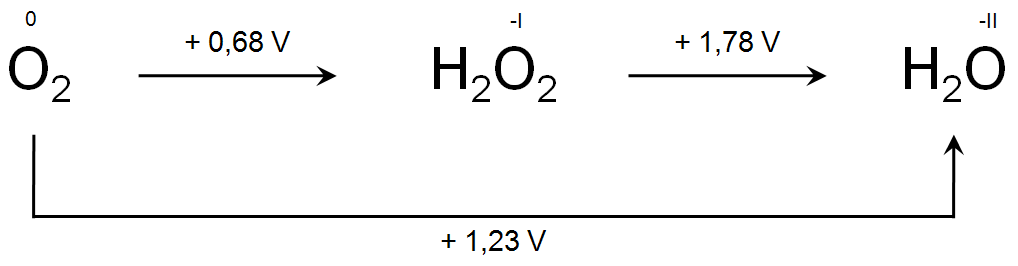

The arrow between O_{2} and H_{2}O_{2} has a value +0.68 V over it, it indicates that the standard electrode potential for the reaction:

O_{2}(g) + 2 H^{+} + 2 e^{−} ⇌ H_{2}O_{2}(aq)

is 0.68 volts.

== Application ==
Latimer diagrams can be used in the construction of Frost diagrams, as a concise summary of the standard electrode potentials relative to the element. Since Δ_{r}G^{~~o~~} = -nFE^{~~o~~}, the electrode potential is a representation of the Gibbs energy change for the given reduction. The sum of the Gibbs energy changes for subsequent reductions (e.g. from O_{2} to H_{2}O_{2}, then from H_{2}O_{2} to H_{2}O) is the same as the Gibbs energy change for the overall reduction (i.e. from O_{2} to H_{2}O), in accordance with Hess's law. This can be used to find the electrode potential for non-adjacent species, which gives all the information necessary for the Frost diagram.

It must be stressed that standard reduction potentials are not additive values. They cannot be directly summed up, or subtracted, from the values (in volts) indicated in a Latimer diagram. If needed, their calculation must be performed via the difference in Gibbs free energies. The easiest way to proceed is simply to use energies (nE) directly expressed in electron-volts (eV), because the Faraday constant F and the sign minus simplifies on both side of the equation. So, the values of E^{~~o~~} in volts must be simply multiplied by the number (n) of electrons transferred in the half-reaction. Since the Faraday constant can disappear from the equation, no need to calculate Δ_{r}G^{~~o~~} expressed in joules.

A Latimer diagram can also indicate if a species will disproportionate in solution under the conditions for which the electrode potentials are given: if the same number of electrons are exchanged in each reaction, and if the potential to the right of the species is higher than the potential on the left, it will disproportionate. Therefore, hydrogen peroxide H_{2}O_{2} is unstable and will disproportionate into O_{2} and H_{2}O.

== See also ==
- Frost diagram
- Pourbaix diagram
- Ellingham diagram
