= Ellingham Hall =

Ellingham Hall may refer to:

- Ellingham Hall, Norfolk
- Ellingham Hall, Northumberland
