= Bockris =

Bockris is a surname. Notable people with the surname include:

- John Bockris (1923–2013), American scientist
- Victor Bockris (born 1949), English writer
