= Comproportionation =

Reaction between two different species of an element to give a same species

Comproportionation or symproportionation is a chemical reaction where two reactants containing the same element but with different oxidation numbers, form a compound having an intermediate oxidation number. It is the opposite of disproportionation.

== Frost diagrams ==
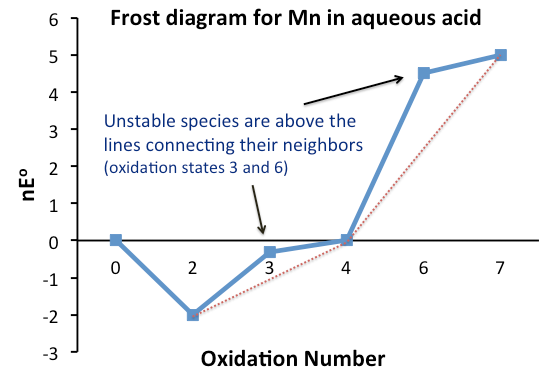
Frost diagram for manganese

In electrochemistry, the tendency of two redox species to disproportionate, or comproportionate, can be determined by examining their Frost diagram. It is a graphical plot of nE° = −ΔG°/F as a function of the oxidation number for the different redox species of a given element.

The Gibbs free energy ΔG° is related to the reduction potential E° by the formula: ΔG° = −nFE° or nE° = −ΔG°/F, where n is the number of transferred electrons, and F is the Faraday constant (F = 96,485 J/(V·mol) = 96,485 Coulomb).

If the value of nE° = −ΔG°/F for a species is lower than the line joining two adjacent, or more generally, neighboring species, having thus a lower and a higher oxidation number, then this species is more stable than its neighbors, and the two surrounding species will undergo comproportionation to minimize the Gibbs free energy of the system. Example: a mixture of Mn(III) and Mn(VI) will comproportionate towards Mn(IV) as illustrated in the Frost diagram for manganese. Non-adjacent neighboring species of Mn obeying the same general rule will also react together as, e.g., Mn^{2+} and MnO^{−}_{4} to form MnO_{2}. So, the more distant Mn(II) and Mn(VII) can also react together to form Mn(IV). The reacting redox species do not have to be necessarily adjacent on a Frost diagram.

The comproportionation reaction cannot easily occur in solids in which the potentially reactive species are immobile and thus cannot react together, or the reaction will be extremely slow and will also require high temperature close to the melting point of the solid to render the reactive species more mobile. However, if these species are soluble, and thus highly mobile in an aqueous solution, they will much more easily encounter, react and undergo comproportionation. In the case of heterogeneous systems involving a solution and one or more solid phases, as in a lead–acid battery, a comproportionation reaction is possible thanks to the mobile dissolved Pb^{2+} ions released into solution at the surface of the battery solid electrodes (Pb and PbO_{2}). In the gas phase, the comproportionation reaction is much faster because of the much higher mobility of the reacting species as illustrated, e.g., in the Claus reaction where H_{2}S and SO_{2} react together to form elemental sulfur. Various classical comproportionation reactions are detailed in the series of examples here below.

== Examples ==
- In lead batteries, the spontaneous reaction is:

Pb + PbO_{2} + 2 H_{2}SO_{4} → 2 PbSO_{4} + 2 H_{2}O

- The laboratory preparation of manganese dioxide involves comproportionation of Mn(II) and Mn(VII) reagents:

2 KMnO_{4} + 3 MnSO_{4} + 2 H_{2}O → 5 MnO_{2} + K_{2}SO_{4} + 2 H_{2}SO_{4}

- In selenium chemistry:

15 Se + SeCl_{4} + 4 AlCl_{3} → 2 Se_{8}[AlCl_{4}]_{2}

- In the Claus process, two gaseous compounds of sulfur comproportionate in the presence of a catalyst to give elemental sulfur:

2 H_{2}S + SO_{2} → 3 S + 2 H_{2}O

- In halogen chemistry:

IO_{3}^{−} + 5 I^{−} + 6 H ^{+} → 3 I_{2} + 3 H_{2}O

- In anammox (anaerobic ammonium oxidation) biochemistry:

NH_{4}^{+} + NO_{2}^{−} → N_{2} + 2 H_{2}O

- Iron(III) chloride reacts with iron powder to form iron(II) chloride:

2 FeCl_{3} + Fe → 3 FeCl_{2}
