= John Bockris =

South African electrochemist (1923–2013)

- Born: 5 January 1923; Johannesburg, South Africa
- Died: 7 July 2013 (aged 90); Gainesville, Florida
- Education: Brighton Technical College; Imperial College, London (PhD 1945; D.Sc. 1952)
- Known for: Bioelectrochemistry; Photoelectrochemistry; Pulse electrolysis BMD model
- Awards: Faraday Medal for electrochemistry (1981); Ig Nobel Prize in Physics (1997)
- Scientific career
- Fields: Physical chemistry
- Institutions: Imperial College, London; University of Pennsylvania; Flinders University; Texas A&M University
- Thesis: Studies in electrolytic polarisation in aqueous and non-aqueous solutions (1945)
- Doctoral advisor: Harold Ellingham
- Notable students: Roger Parsons

Bernhardt Patrick John O’Mara Bockris (5 January 1923 – 7 July 2013) was a South African professor of chemistry, latterly at Texas A&M University. During his long and prolific career he published some 700 papers and two dozen books. His best known work is in electrochemistry but his output also extended to environmental chemistry, photoelectrochemistry and bioelectrochemistry. In the 1990s he experimented with cold fusion and transmutation, topics on which his unorthodox views provoked controversy.

== Early life ==
John Bockris was born on 5 January 1923, in Johannesburg, South Africa. His mother was Emmeline Mary MacNally and his father Alfred Bockris. He attended a sequence of schools in Brighton, including the preparatory school Withdean Hall from 1934 to 1937, and Xaverian College, a Catholic secondary school, from 1937 to 1940. His father was not present during his childhood: His mother and aunt earned their income from tailoring.

== University education ==
In 1940 Bockris began his scholarly education at Brighton Technical College which, in 1992, became the University of Brighton. Bockris wanted to study for a degree in Physics but this was not possible due to wartime staff shortages. Instead he took a two-year general degree in the natural sciences. In 1943, after a year of further study, he was accepted by Imperial College, London as a graduate student. He avoided conscription into the British armed forces due to his South African nationality.

Bockris relates that his supervisor, Harold Ellingham, provided minimal guidance and soon left the university altogether. Despite these obstacles, Bockris finished the research for his thesis, Electrochemistry of Non-aqueous Solutions, in two years, and received his doctorate in September 1945.

== Academic career ==
Upon completion of his doctorate, at the age of 22, Bockris was immediately appointed to the faculty of Imperial College on the recommendation of Harry Emeléus. Over the course of the next eight years he supervised 28 graduate students with whom he co-authored a sufficient number of publications to qualify for his D.Sc., which he obtained in 1952. Among these students was Roger Parsons, a future fellow of the Royal Society, whom Bockris held in high regard.

Bockris moved to USA in 1953 to join the University of Pennsylvania as Professor of Chemistry, where he built a large and active research group. It was here that he published his best known work: the first model of the electrode-electrolyte surface to include the dipole moment of the solvent, and his two-volume textbook Modern Electrochemistry. After 18 years in Philadelphia, however, departmental politics became such that Bockris felt the need to move. During next appointment, at Flinders University of South Australia from 1971 onwards, his interests broadened to include photoelectrochemistry and environmental chemistry. In 1979 Bockris made his final move to Texas A&M University where he remained until his retirement in 1997. In his later years his research focus veered further toward sources of energy and he embraced positions on some controversial topics that acquired a certain celebrity but damaged his professional reputation.

Electrode kinetics remained a major component of his research program throughout. Bockris also conducted investigations of high temperature chemistry, the determinants of electrolyte solubility, and hydrogen/metal interactions.

Bockris was a prolific scholar, collaborator, and mentor. By the end of his career, he had authored, coauthored or edited more than 700 papers and two dozen books, and 85 students had obtained a PhD degree with his supervision.

== Controversies ==
=== Hydrogen as a fuel ===
In 1970, Bockris, then a professor at the University of Pennsylvania, said he had found a method for using sunlight to free hydrogen from water and coined the term "hydrogen economy" to describe the application of the anticipated technology. In 1975 he published a book on the subject. In 1982, at Texas A&M, he announced a "quantum leap" in his hydrogen-fuel technology through a "secret catalyst" that split water into hydrogen and oxygen even without the energy of sunlight. In 1984, he said he had found a material that facilitated complete conversion of sunlight to electricity. All of these "discoveries" were eventually attributed to basic errors in his research, although Bockris himself never acknowledged his mistakes.

=== Cold fusion ===
Bockris performed a series of cold fusion experiments in the wake of the announcement in 1989 by Pons and Fleischmann that their electrolysis of heavy water had produced results consistent with nuclear fusion. Many groups attempted similar experiments: Bockris' research group was one of few to provide results that supported those of Pons and Fleischmann, reporting decisive evidence of tritium production. Their results were greeted with widespread skepticism. Gary Taubes wrote an editorial in Science suggesting that their cells might have been spiked with tritiated water. An academic tribunal at Texas A&M eventually ruled out fraud, declaring that intentionally spiked experiments gave different results. Bockris, seemingly inured to criticism, published his side of the controversy in a stubborn defense of academic freedom.

Though his professional reputation declined after this episode, the International Society for Condensed Matter Nuclear Reactions continued to hold Bockris in high esteem, awarding him its Preparata Medal in 2012.

=== Transmutation ===
In 1993, Bockris claimed to be experimenting with the transmutation of elements, specifically of base metals into gold. The scientist received a degree of media attention for these extraordinary claims, to the extent that other academics at Texas A&M felt that the institution's reputation was suffering from the connection to the discredited "science" of alchemy. An editorial by Mike Epstein in the Journal of Scientific Exploration describes what happened next:

A petition signed by 23 of the 28 distinguished professors at Texas A&M called on the university provost to strip Bockris of his title as distinguished professor. The petition follows a letter written by 11 full professors in the chemistry department (out of the department's 38 full professors) calling on Bockris to resign and remove the "shadow" he has cast over the department. The petition from the distinguished professors said "For a trained scientist to claim, or support anyone else's claim to have transmuted elements is difficult for us to believe and is no more acceptable than to claim to have invented a gravity shield, revived the dead or to be mining green cheese on the moon. We believe that Bockris' recent activities have made the terms 'Texas A&M' and 'Aggie' objects of derisive laughter throughout the world..."

Epstein's conclusion, however, was a defense of academic freedom:

"However, I would remind those who seek his ouster or demotion that their actions threaten the core of academic freedom. Extraordinary claims require extraordinary proof, but no one should be punished for attempting to provide that proof".

The petition failed, and Dr. Bockris was eventually absolved by a four-professor panel of violating Texas A&M standards in proposing, conducting or reporting controversial research.

In 1997, Bockris was awarded an Ig Nobel Prize in the field of Physics for his work in cold fusion and transmutation. The awardee declined to accept the trophy in person.

== Honours and awards ==
- Médaille d’honneur, from the University of Louvain in Belgium, 1951.
- Breyer-Gutmann Medal, Australian Chemical Society, 1975.
- The Chemical Lecture Award, the Swedish Academy, 1979.
- Membership of Swedish Academy of Engineers as foreign member, 1979.
- The Faraday Medal of the Electrochemistry Group of the Royal Society of Chemistry, 1981
- Award of the Chemical Society of the USA for Developments of Modern Fuels, 1982.
- Award in Teaching Electrochemistry, Electrochemical Society, 1985.
- Honorary doctorate from the University of La Plata, Argentina, 1986.
- Honorary PhD of the University of Hokkaido, Japan, 1988.
- Member of the Serbian Academy of Sciences, 1992.
- Volta Medal in Physics associated with the Bicentenary of Volta, Pavia, Italy, 2000.
- Ig Nobel Prize in Physics, 1997

== Publications ==
- Bockris, J. O'M.; Devanathan, M. A. V.; Muller, K. (1 June 1963). "On the Structure of Charged Interfaces". Proceedings of the Royal Society A: Mathematical, Physical and Engineering Sciences. 274 (1356). The Royal Society: 55–79. Bibcode:1963RSPSA.274...55B. doi:10.1098/rspa.1963.0114. ISSN 1364-5021. S2CID 94958336.
- Bockris, J. O'M.; Reddy, A. K. N. (1970). Modern electrochemistry; an introduction to an interdisciplinary area (1st ed.). New York: Plenum Press. ISBN 978-0-306-37036-6. OCLC 2478818.

== See also ==
- List of Ig Nobel Prize winners
- Timeline of hydrogen technologies
