= Roger Parsons =

British professor of chemistry (1926–2017)

Roger Parsons FRSC FRS
- Born: 1926; London, England
- Died: 7 January 2017 (aged 90–91)
- Citizenship: United Kingdom
- Education: Imperial College London
- Awards: Davy Medal (2003)
- Scientific career
- Fields: Electrochemistry
- Workplaces: Dundee University; Bristol University; CNRS; Southampton University
- Doctoral advisor: John Bockris

Roger Parsons FRSC FRS (1926 – 7 January 2017) was a British chemist (electrochemist).

== Biography ==
Parsons studied chemistry at Imperial College London, obtaining a first class bachelor's degree in 1947. His doctorate, supervised by John Bockris, was awarded the following year. In 1951 he was appointed lecturer at the University of St. Andrews in Dundee (now Dundee University), researching electrochemical kinetics and thermodynamics under Douglas Hugh Everett. In 1954, Parsons accompanied Everett to the University of Bristol, where he was appointed professor. In 1977 Parsons was appointed Directeur du Laboratoired'Electrochimie Interfaciale (director of the laboratory of interfacial electrochemistry) at the CNRS in France, moving to Southampton in 1985 before retiring in 1992.

Parsons served as editor of the Journal of Electroanalytical Chemistry and as president of the Faraday Division of the Royal Chemical Society.

== Research ==
His work dealt with kinetics (especially hydrogen evolution in electrolysis), electrocapillarity and adsorption processes, optical methods in interfacial electrochemistry, single crystal electrode processes and the electrochemical double layer.

== Awards and honours ==
In 1979, he was awarded the Olin Palladium Award by the Electrochemical Society. Parsons was elected to the Royal Society in 1980, and won the society's Davy Medal in 2003.
