= Pulse electrolysis =

Electrolysis method

Pulse Electrolysis
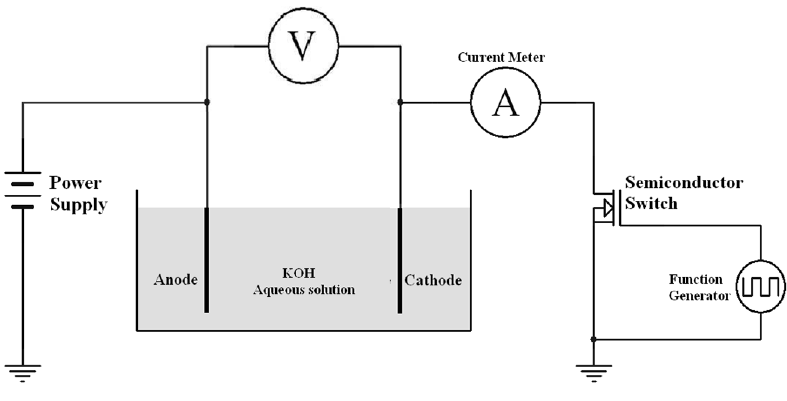
- A Simplified Experimental Pulse Electrolysis Cell

Typical Materials
- Type of Electrolysis: PDC Electrolysis
- Catalyst material on the anode: Aluminium
- Catalyst material on the cathode: Aluminium

State-of-the-art Operating Ranges
- Cell temperature: 25 ± 2°C
- Current density: 400 mA
- Cell voltage: +18 V DC
- Cell voltage efficiency: 60-70%

Pulse electrolysis is an alternate electrolysis method that utilises a pulsed direct current to initiate non-spontaneous chemical reactions. Also known as pulsed direct current (PDC) electrolysis, the increased number of variables that it introduces to the electrolysis method can change the application of the current to the electrodes and the resulting outcome. This varies from direct current (DC) electrolysis, which only allows the variation of one value, the voltage applied. By utilising conventional pulse width modulation (PMW), multiple dependent variables can be altered, including the type of waveform, typically a rectangular pulse wave, the duty cycle, and the frequency. Currently, there has been a focus on theoretical and experimental research into PDC electrolysis in terms of the electrolysis of water to produce hydrogen. Claims have been made that there is a possibility it can result in a higher electrical efficiency in comparison to DC water electrolysis, but past research has shown this is not the case. The varying voltage and current added on top of the DC cause additional energy consumption with no effect on the hydrogen production. Because of the increasing energy consumption, attempts to replicate claimed benefits experimentally have not succeeded, and have found negative effects on the electrolyser longevity instead.

PDC electrolysis is not only confined to the electrolysis of water. Uses in industry such as electroplating and electrocrystallisation are also undergoing research due to the wider range of properties that can be achieved.

The various and alterable effects of using intermittent pulses in PDC electrolysis has resulted in an area of interest that could benefit industry. However, as it is still being researched and has produced conflicting results, a consistent and reliable answer to how dependent electrolysis efficiency is on the properties of an electrical pulse has not been determined, hence, other forms of electrolysis such as polymer electrolyte membrane and alkaline water electrolysis are being used in industry.

== Research history ==
PDC electrolysis was first considered theoretically in 1952, and experimental research began as early as 1960 however it was originally focused on its technical applications to industry and the possibilities of improving the quality and rate of metal deposition. It partially succeeded, providing promising results its ability to create smoother, denser deposits, and reducing the amount of metal required in electroplating.

The first instance it was considered to initialise the electrolysis of water was from the perspective of magnetolysis in 1985, where high strength magnets, or in this case electromagnets, are used in conjunction with homopolar propellers. Ghoroghichian and Bockris conducted this experimental research to determine how a pulsed current can impact the rate of hydrogen production and provide economic advantages. A current density ratio of 2.07 was observed, demonstrating, for the first time, that a pulsed current can double the production of hydrogen, in comparison to a steady state current.

Since hydrogen gas cannot be collected in its free form, and it can be used to provide a source of renewable and clean energy through fuel cells, discovering an electrolysis method with the greatest efficiency is valued. With early experimental and theoretical success, many patents began to be developed until as recent as 2002, but since 1985, it has only been researched intermittently with varying levels of success.

== Experimental research ==
With the perspective that the current use of non-renewable fuel sources is a main cause of global environmental problems, hydrogen is being viewed as a possible renewable fuel source replacement. For this to be feasible, the production of hydrogen, through methods such as electrolysis, must be efficient in terms of the energy, cost and time required. Whilst multiple methods of pulse electrolysis have been studied, and experimental results are mixed, the underlying theory behind this experimental approach seems to remain consistent.

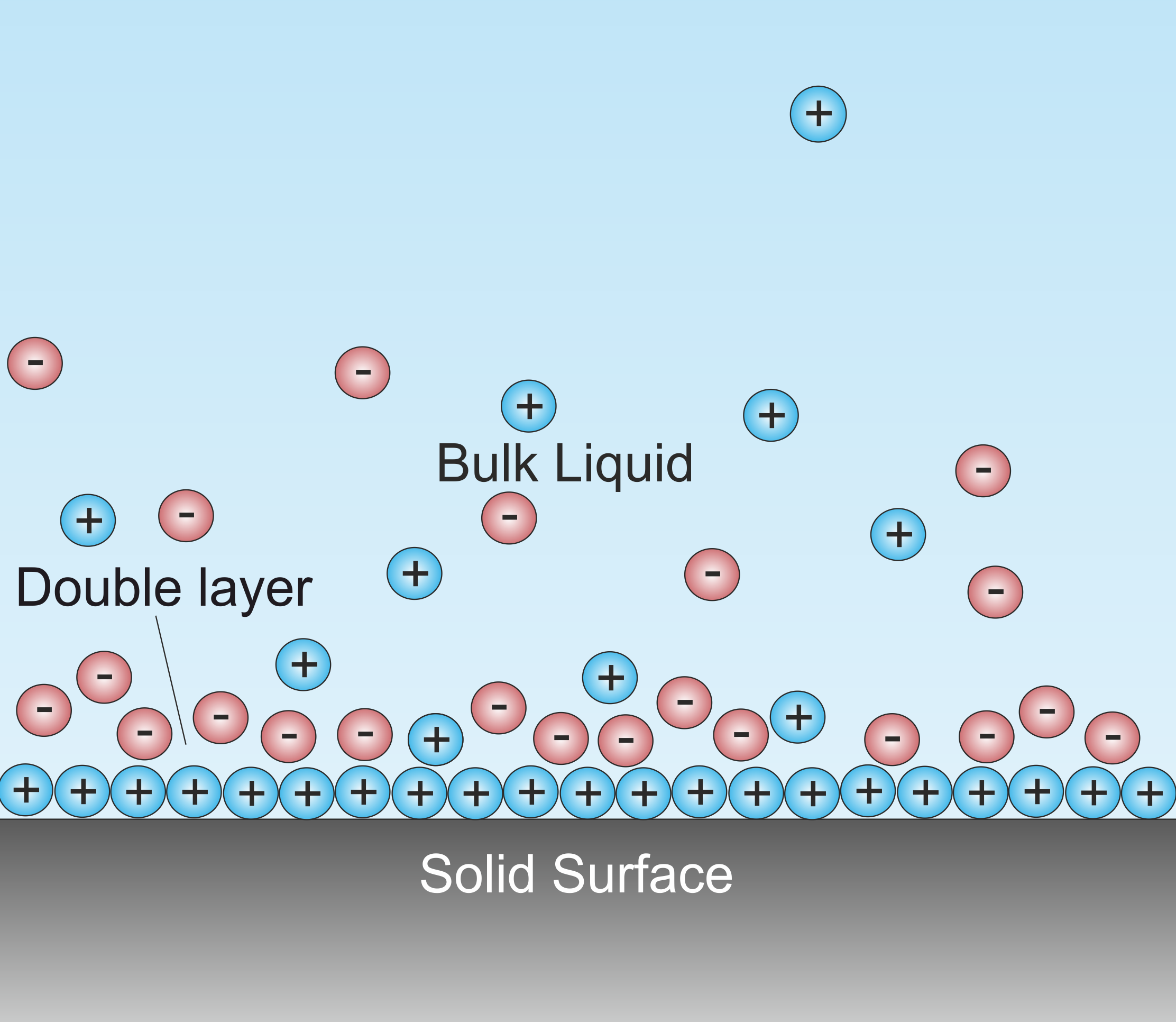
Double Layer

=== Theoretical Concept ===
When a voltage is applied to an electrolysis cell, immediately following this an Electric Double Layer (EDL), or a diffusion layer, is theoretically formed. This can create a capacitance, or can cause the electrolyser to act as a capacitor. When this is present, excess voltage must be supplied by the direct current to compensate for the loss in the 'capacitor', which rises the required voltage supplied to what is called the thermo-neutral voltage. One of the aims of PDC electrolysis is to overcome this, and theoretically, when the PWM switches the current on, a capacitance will be stored, and when the duty cycle is over, it will be released, continuing the flow of current whilst reducing the EDL that is formed.

Poláčik and Pospíšil believe that by manipulating the dependent variables, such as the duty cycle, can increase or decrease the effectiveness of pulse electrolysis at reducing this layer. A theoretical equation, the Sand equation, is used to calculate the amount of time required to allow the EDL to fall to zero, and allow PDC electrolysis to achieve its highest efficiencies.

=== Use in Magnetolisis ===
Electrolysers require high currents produced by very low voltages. A homopolar generator has the ability to do this, so in Bockris and Ghoroghchian's original experiment in 1985, they followed Faraday's idea. Using a magnetic field of 0.86T produced by permanent magnets, they placed a stainless-steel disc in between. The disc needed a rotation speed of 2000 rpm to reach the correct electrical potential for electrolysis. The difference between Faraday's original model and Bockris and Ghorogchian's is that their disc will only rotate when it is in contact with an electrolyte.

They encountered one large problem, a viscous force created by the electrolyte, that slowed down the motion of the disc. The two ways they could fix this is to rotate the disc and solution together or increase the magnetic field used. The latter being most practicable, the required magnetic field was calculated according to the power consumption rate or producing a cubic meter of hydrogen. It was discovered a magnetic field of 11T was needed for effective electrolysis, more than 16 times greater than what was originally used. Since superconducting magnets would be required, and they can become too expensive to justify their use, ruling this out as a possible method.

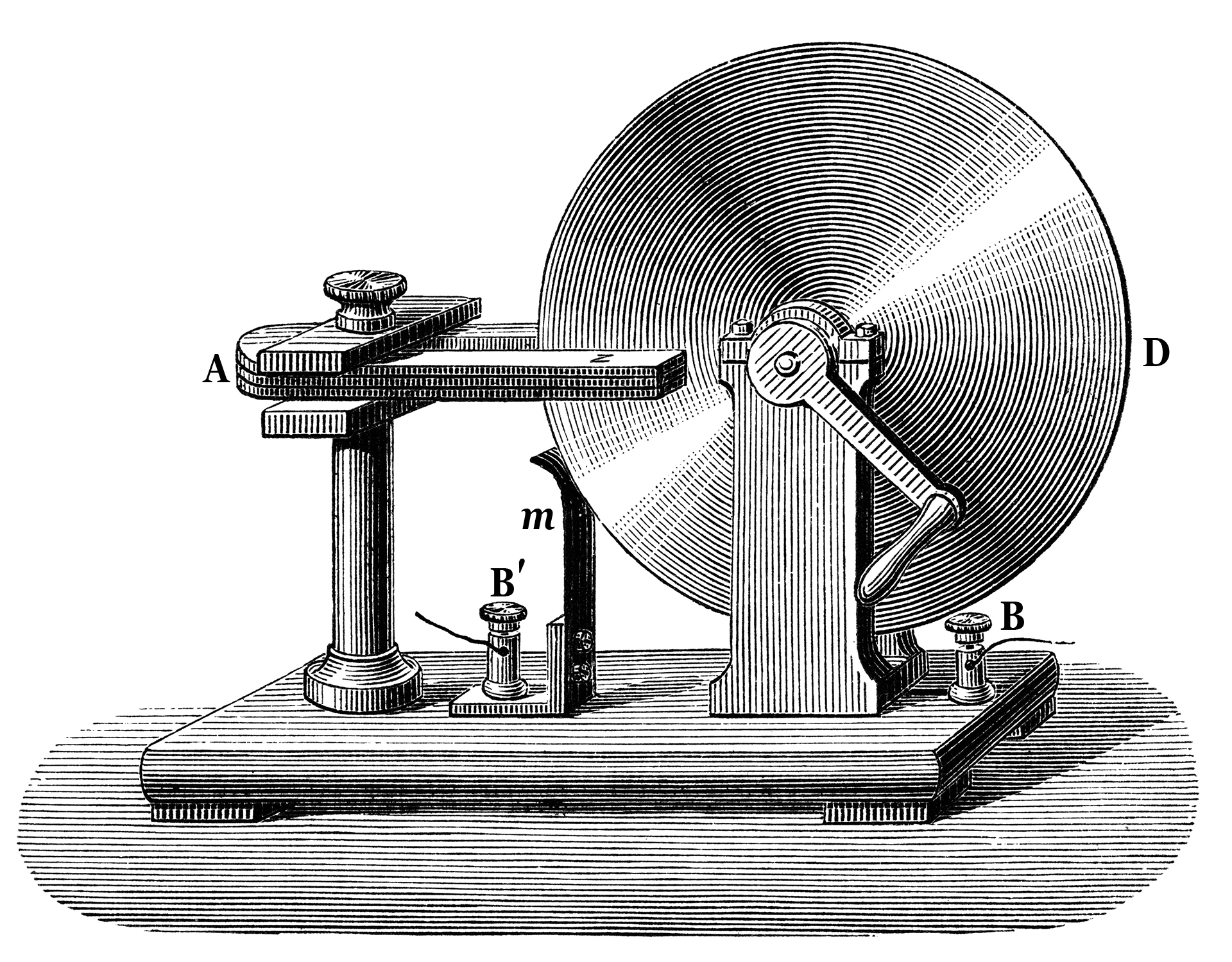
Faraday disk generator the Magnetolysis design was based on

Their final decision was to use a homopolar generator as an external source of power. This follows Faraday's method more closely.

In this method, a pulse potential was created to take advantage of previous studies that give an effectiveness factor of 2 when either a nickel electrode or a Teflon-bonded platinum electrode was used.

The generator was constructed with a magnetic flux density of 0.6T, a propeller radius of 30 cm and a loop coated with copper strips. To increase the output potential, and reducing the rotation speed required, these were connected in series. Pulses of 2-3V that were sustained for 1ms were achieved.

This was the first instance of a successful application of pulse electrolysis for the production of hydrogen. However, it still presents its own limitations in the possibility for it to be used in industry.

=== Conflicting research ===
A comparison between a pulsed and non-pulsed dc current electrolysers was explored in 1993 by Shaaban, that demonstrated a non-pulsed current used the least electrical power.

The experimental electrolyser separated the anolyte and catholyte compartments and used a 324-Naflon membrane to allow the ion exchange. The distance between the anode, made with platinum coated titanium, and the cathode, stainless steel, was 3mm and was immersed in a 10 weight percent sulfuric acid electrolyte. He conducted tests under several different frequencies that included '0.01 Hz, 0.5 kHz, 5 kHz, i kHz, 10 kHz, 25 kHz, and 40 kHz' and with four duty cycles, '10, 25, 50, and 80%'.

Initial observations revealed that the off-period resulted in a reversal in polarity, causing the reaction to reverse. This effected the cathode, which displayed a 2g loss after experimentation. A diode was input into the circuit to rectify the polarity. However, the cell was prevented from dropping to 0 V during the off-period, maintaining a higher value of 2.3V. This further impacted the experiment, distorting the square wave produced by the function generator Shaaban used, as the electrical potential provided needed to overcome the cell voltage of 2.3V before current could flow. Bokris et al. records that current would continue to flow, discharging ions from the EDL, but this was contradicted in this experiment. This only occurred when the diode was in place but it prevented a current spike in the duty cycle as well.

With a 10% duty cycle at a 1 kHz pulse, temperature increases of nearly 7 °C greater than in the non-pulsed experimental electrolysis, were found. Temperature increases can prevent the circuit

Calculating the power consumption, it was determined a non-pulsed current had power demand losses of 3.5%, and a pulsed current resulted in 13 - 16% losses. It also opposes the idea from Bockris et al. that the effectiveness of non-pulsed dc current electrolysis increases by a factor of 2 when a pulsed current is applied.

== Industrial Uses ==
The possible increased effect a pulsed current will have on the corrodibility of metals was first looked at by de la Rive in 1837. It was investigated around 60 years later by Coehn regarding the effect of a current with a rectangular waveform, on the plating of zinc deposits, resulting in a successful application for a patent. A full review on using PDC electrolysis in electroplating, also known as electrodeposition or 'pulse plating', was only published in 1954 by Baeyens, this being the first area of research into the use of pulse electrolysis in industry.

A pulsed current can be varied in many ways that increases the possible outcomes and can vary the properties of deposited metals during electroplating. Hansel and Roy, in their review of the third European Pulse Plating Seminar, concluded that each deposition system must have a unique sequence developed in order to optimise the process and gain the desired results, opposing the inability of traditional plating to be as freely tailored to a situation. The nucleation and crystallisation of the deposition metal is directly affected and can have favourable or unfavourable circumstances if specific conditions are not met. It is reported that pulse plating can encourage nucleation causing grain refinement, and reducing grain size, as well as increasing the deposit density that can improve micro hardness.

These effects were first researched on zinc by Coehn. It was discovered a pulsed current at a high frequency can produce deposits of higher quality, with properties ranging from a smoother finish by the reduction in grain size, as well as lowering its corrosion rate. This is beneficial as it is mainly used as a sacrificial anode in industry.

== Claimed advantages ==
In theoretical electrolysis of water, a voltage of only 1.23 V is required to split water into hydrogen and oxygen. The formation of an EDL increases this to its thermo-neutral voltage of 1.45 V. It is claimed that minimising the EDL formed during pulse electrolysis is advantageous, as it can reduce the thermo-neutral voltage and the energy input required, increasing energy efficiency. However, this claim follows from a misconseption regarding energy consumption in the system when varying current and voltage waveforms are applied. The hydrogen production rate in the process is determined by the mean of the current waveform, according to the Faraday's law of electrolysis, but the mean of the voltage waveform is not sufficient to evaluate the rate of energy consumption. Instead, the mean of the product of instantaneous current and voltage should be assessed, revealing increased energy consumption due to the alternating current and voltage waveforms, in comparison to DC water electrolysis with an equal hydrogen production rate.

== Disadvantages ==
Whilst the method of PDC electrolysis has been claimed by Ghoroghichian and Bockris in 1952 and 1985 to work extremely well in theory, it is difficult to replicate with consistently positive results in practical experimentation. As further research about the dynamic operation of water electrolysis have found only negative impact from alternating the current and voltage supplied to the system, both from energetical and longetivity point of view, the claimed benefits of pulsed electrolysis might not have basis in reality. The energy consumption of a system with only positive resistance (cf. negative resistance) can only increase as a function of current and voltage amplitude.

According to Shabaan, during the pulse-off period, if the electrolytic cell is not constructed properly, the current polarity can reverse. This can cause the cathode to deteriorate. In electrolysis, the cathode is where the reduction of hydrogen occurs, forming the desired hydrogen gas. Any loss in mass can reduce the speed and effectiveness of the electrolytic reaction, reducing the overall efficiency of the pulse electrolysis method.

Shaaban also states that due to expected internal losses, such as through heat, the current density required will increase, which increases the required voltage. As a result, greater over potentials are needed that further converts to heat.
