= Ellingham Hall, Northumberland =

Ellingham Hall
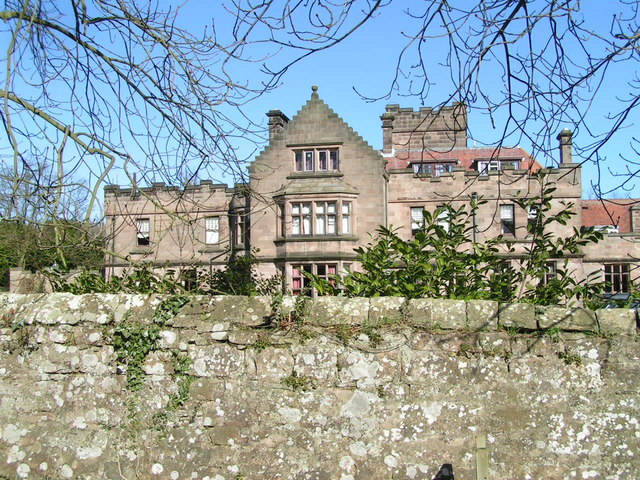
- Ellingham Hall, Northumberland

- Location within Northumberland

General information
- Type: Country house
- Location: Ellingham, Northumberland, United Kingdom
- Coordinates: 55.526861°N 1.727175°W
- Owner: Helen and Aidan Ruff

Ellingham Hall, Northumberland is an English country house in the county of Northumberland, in the civil parish of Ellingham.

The hall was built in the 17th century by Sir John Haggerston on the site of an earlier building. It was enlarged under the ownership of his successor, Edward Haggerston, but suffered severe damage in a fire that burned most of the East wing to the ground. The Haggerstons sheltered Catholic priests within secret tunnels and chambers during the persecutions of the Reformation.

In the Second World War, the Ellingham estate was farmed by the Women's Land Army who put the tennis courts into cultivation and used the reception rooms as a food storage centre. From 1955 to 1988 the hall was used a preparatory school for boys aged 5 to 18. It was subsequently bought by property developers but a plan to convert the building into residential flats and houses on the land was usurped by NatWest bank during the crash of 1989, despite being offered 25% interest until the properties were sold; thereafter the hall was left standing empty and vulnerable to vandalism and the elements. It was bought in 1995 by Helen and Aidan Ruff, who restored and renovated it to serve as a country house venue for holiday rental, parties, weddings and corporate events. The refurbished building was reopened in 2003. In May 2010, the chapel was gutted by fire.

In December 2010, Ellingham Hall found itself bombarded by calls after WikiLeaks founder Julian Assange was bailed to stay at its namesake, Ellingham Hall, Norfolk. Owner Aidan Ruff told The Journal newspaper: "We’re just trying to make an honest living, and deliver our brides and grooms the dream weddings they want. We’re not interested in bringing down governments or world domination."
