= Harold Ellingham =

British chemist

Harold Johann Thomas Ellingham, OBE, (1897–1975) was a British physical chemist, best known for his Ellingham diagrams, which summarize a large amount of information concerning extractive metallurgy. Ellingham was born in Tottenham on 21 November 1897, the son of Thomas Robert Ellingham (fine art designer) and Katherine Caroline Bauer.

He studied at the Royal College of Science from 1914 to 1916. (Note: Although the Royal College of Science had been formally merged with the Royal School of Mines and the City and Guilds Central Technical College in 1907 to form the Imperial College of Science and Technology, it retained an independent identity as a constituent college until 2002.) During the war years he served as a lieutenant in the Royal Engineers, in Mesopotamia (1917-1919) and India (May-June 1919). On returning to the College he became a demonstrator at the college in 1919 and reader in physical chemistry in 1937. He was secretary of the Royal College of Science 1940–44 and of the Royal Institute of Chemistry 1944–63. He was made a fellow of Imperial College in 1949 and an Officer of the Order of the British Empire (OBE) in 1962.

Ellingham is best known for his diagrams plotting the Gibbs energy change for the reaction

2x/y M + O_{2} ⇌ 2/y M_{x}O_{y}

against temperature. By normalizing the thermodynamic functions to the reaction with one mole of oxygen, Ellingham was able to compare the temperature stability of many different oxides on the same diagram. In particular, he could show graphically that carbon becomes a stronger reducing agent as the temperature increases. (Note: This phenomenon was known before Ellingham's time, but Ellingham demonstrated it more clearly. The reason for the increase in reducing power with temperature is the positive entropy change for the reaction 2 C + O_{2} ⇌ 2 CO, as opposed to the negative entropy changes for the formation of solid metal oxides.) The reduction of metal oxides with carbon (or carbon monoxide) to form the free metals is of immense industrial importance (e.g., the manufacture of iron in a blast furnace), and Ellingham diagrams show the lowest temperature at which the reaction will occur for each metal.

He married Doris Karin Russell in Kensington in 1945. He died in Harrow on 19 December 1975. Doris died in Hawkhurst on 27 September 1984.
