= Faraday constant =

Physical constant: Electric charge of one mole of electrons

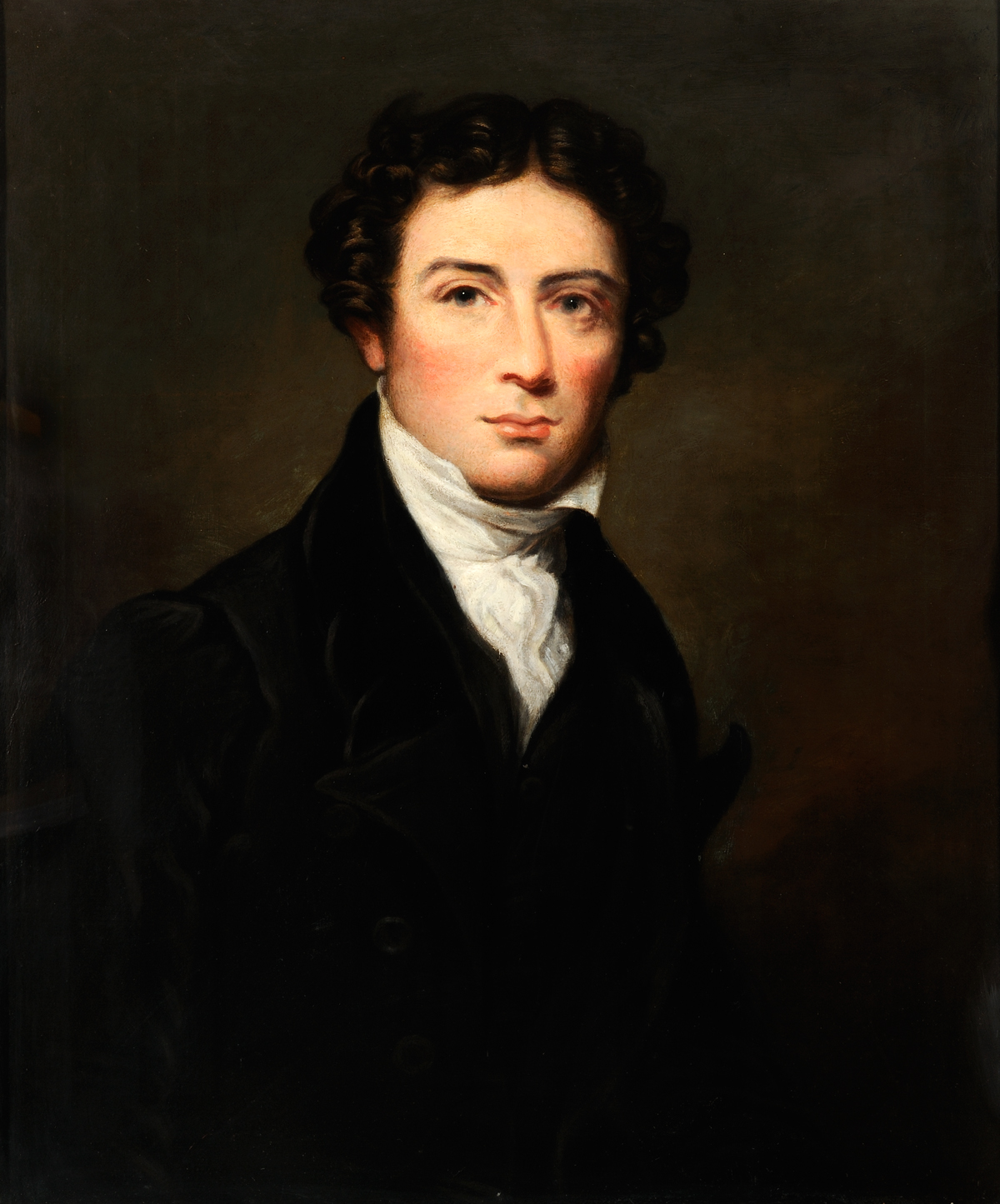
- Michael Faraday, the constant's namesake
- Common symbols: F
- SI unit: coulomb per mole (C/mol)
- In SI base units: s⋅A⋅mol^{−1}
- Derivations from other quantities: F = eN_{A}
- Value: 96485.33212 C/mol

In physical chemistry, the Faraday constant (symbol F, sometimes stylized as ℱ) is a physical constant defined as the quotient of the total electric charge (q) by the amount (n) of elementary charge carriers in any given sample of matter: F = q/n; it is expressed in units of coulombs per mole (C/mol). As such, it represents the "molar elementary charge", that is, the electric charge of one mole of elementary carriers (e.g., protons). It is named after the English scientist Michael Faraday. Since the 2019 revision of the SI, the Faraday constant has an exactly defined value, the product of the elementary charge (e, in coulombs) and the Avogadro constant (N_{A}, in reciprocal moles):

F = eN_{A} = 9.64853321233100184×10^{4} C/mol.

== Derivation ==
The Faraday constant can be thought of as the proportionality factor between the charge in coulombs (used in physics and in practical electrical measurements) and the amount of substance in moles (used in chemistry), and is therefore of particular use in electrochemistry, particularly in electrolysis calculations. Because the elementary charge is exactly 1.602176634×10^{−19} C, and there are exactly N_{A} = 6.02214076×10^{23} entities per mole, the Faraday constant is given by the product of these two quantities:

F = eN_{A}
= 1.602176634×10^{−19} C × 6.02214076×10^{23} mol^{−1}
= 9.64853321233100184×10^{4} C/mol.

The value of F was first determined in the 1800s by weighing the amount of silver deposited in an electrochemical reaction, in which a measured current was passed for a measured time, and using Faraday's law of electrolysis. Until about 1970, the most reliable value of the Faraday constant was determined by a related method of electro-dissolving silver metal in perchloric acid.

== Unit of charge ==
Related to the Faraday constant is the faraday, a unit of electrical charge. One faraday is the amount of charge in one mole of electrons:

1 faraday = F × 1 mol = 9.64853321233100184×10^{4} C = N_{0}e = 6.02214076×10^{23} e.

Where N_{0} is the Avogadro number. A faraday will electrodeposit one mole of silver metal atoms.

== See also ==
- Farad, the unit of electrical capacitance
- Faraday efficiency
- Faraday's laws of electrolysis
- Faraday cup
