= LCF =

LCF may refer to:

== Organisations ==
- Canadian Football League (Ligue canadienne de football)
- Lawyers' Christian Fellowship
- London College of Fashion

== Science and technology ==
- Low-cycle fatigue, plastic deformation and low cycle
- LCF notation, for cubic Hamiltonian graphs
- Logic of Computable Functions, a deductive system for computable functions, 1969 formalism by Dana Scott
- Logic for Computable Functions, an interactive automated theorem prover, 1973 formalism by Robin Milner
- Landing Craft, Flak, a World war 2 Landing craft (BPC)
- Lattice confinement fusion, a specific technique in Nuclear fusion

== Transportation and military ==
- Low cab forward, a body style of truck
- Boeing 747 Large Cargo Freighter
- Launch control facility (disambiguation)
- De Zeven Provinciën-class frigate (Luchtverdedigings- en commandofregat, air defense and command frigate)
- Ford LCF, a medium-duty cab-over truck
- Chevrolet LCF (disambiguation), a line of commercial cab-over trucks

== Other uses ==
- La Cañada Flintridge, California, a city in the US
- LCF, a signature in the movie The Ninth Gate
