= Oriani =

Oriani is an Italian surname. Notable people with the surname include:

- Alfredo Oriani (1852–1909), Italian author
- Barnaba Oriani, Italian priest and astronomer
- Carlo Oriani, Italian cyclist
- Constanza Oriani, Argentine fencer
- Mario Oriani-Ambrosini, Italian-American lawyer
- Richard Oriani, American chemist

== See also ==
- 4540 Oriani, main-belt asteroid
- Oriani class destroyer, Italian-made ship
