= Michael McKubre =

New Zealand electrochemist

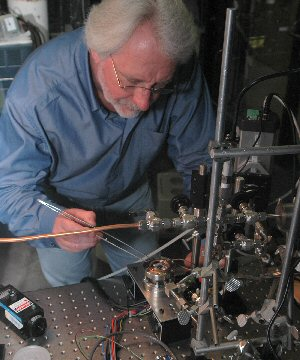
- Michael McKubre working on deuterium gas-based cold fusion cell used by SRI International.
- Born: New Zealand
- Died: August 2025
- Education: Victoria University of Wellington
- Scientific career
- Fields: cold fusion
- Workplaces: SRI International
- Thesis: An Impedance Study of the Membrane Polarisation Effect in Simulated Rock Systems (1976)
- Doctoral advisor: John Tomlinson

Michael Charles Harold McKubre was an electrochemist involved with cold fusion energy research. McKubre was the director of the Energy Research Center at SRI International in 1998. He is a native of New Zealand.

== Education ==
McKubre completed two degrees at Victoria University of Wellington, a Master's degree in 1972, titled A Study of the Frequency Domain Induced Polarisation Effects Displayed by Clay and by Cation Exchange Resin, Model Soil Systems, followed by a PhD in 1976 on membrane polarisation effects in simulated rock systems.

== Career ==
From 1989 to 2002, he researched cold fusion at SRI International. Unlike other researchers in the same field, he obtained mainstream funding during all his research: first from the Electric Power Research Institute, then from the Japanese government, and in 2002 he had funding from the U.S. government.

In January 1992 a cold fusion cell exploded in an SRI lab. One of McKubre's collaborators was killed and three people including McKubre were wounded. McKubre still has pieces of glass embedded in his side. Subsequent experiments were done behind bulletproof glass.

In 2004 he and other cold fusion researchers asked the United States Department of Energy (DOE) to give a new review to the field of cold fusion, and he co-authored a report with all the available experimental and theoretical evidence since the 1989 review. The 2004 review concluded that "while significant progress has been made in the sophistication of calorimeters since the review of this subject in 1989, the conclusions reached by the reviewers today are similar to those found in the 1989 review."

As of 2010, he was still making experiments with palladium cells at SRI International, and collaborates with the ENEA laboratory, where the most reliable palladium is being produced. McKubre more recently took part as one of the 22 physicists of the Steorn "jury".

== Selected publications ==
- Hagelstein, Peter; Michael, McKubre; Nagel, David; Chubb, Talbot; Hekman, Randall (2004). New Physical Effects in Metal Deuterides (PDF). Washington: US Department of Energy. Archived from the original on 2007-01-06. (manuscript) Paper listing the available experimental evidence of cold fusion.
