= Adil Shamoo =

Iraqi biochemist

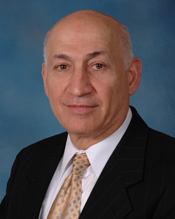
Dr. Adil E. Shamoo

Adil E. Shamoo (born August 1, 1941) is an Iraqi biochemist with an interest in biomedical ethics and foreign policy. He is currently a professor at the Department of Biochemistry and Molecular Biology at the University of Maryland.

== Professional ==
In 1998, he founded the journal Accountability in Research, and has served as its editor-in-chief since its inception. He is on the editorial boards of several other journals, including the Drug Information Journal. From 2000 to 2002, he served on the advisory committee for National Human Research Protections. Although he has an extensive list of publications in the fields of biochemistry and microbiology, he is currently busied by his work as an analyst for Foreign Policy In Focus, a project of the Institute for Policy Studies, a think tank, to which he has been contributing since 2005. Shamoo has also authored and co-authored many op-eds on U.S. foreign policy that have been published in newspapers across the country.

Shamoo is also currently occupied with his work in the field of ethics. Since 1991, he has taught a graduate course at the University of Maryland entitled "Responsible Conduct of Research". In 1995, he co-founded the human rights organization, Citizens for Responsible Care and Research (CIRCARE). In 2003, he chaired a Special Issue GlaxoSmithKline Pharmaceuticals' Ethics Advisory Group. Shamoo was then appointed to the Armed Forces Epidemiological Board (AFEB) of the United States Department of Defense as ethics consultant (2003–2004). Because he served as chairman on nine international conferences in ethics in research and human research protection, he was asked to testify before a congressional committee and the National Bioethics Advisory Commission. Since 2006, he has served on the Defense Health Board. And from 2006 to 2007, Shamoo was a member of the new Maryland Governor's Higher Education Transition Working Group. He was an invited participant and presenter in the 2007 New Year Renaissance Weekend.

Shamoo has held visiting professorships at the Institute for Political Studies in Paris, France and at East Carolina University.

Shamoo has been cited and/or appeared frequently in local and national media both print and television. He has published numerous articles and books.

== Personal ==
Shamoo currently resides in Columbia, MD with his wife and occasional co-author, Bonnie Bricker; his daughter, and stepdaughter. He has two sons and another stepdaughter who also all reside in the Washington Metropolitan Area.

== Early life and education ==
Shamoo was born and raised in Baghdad, Iraq. He is an ethnic Assyrian. He attended the University of Baghdad and graduated with a degree in physics in 1962. In 1966, he earned a Master's of Science in physics from the University of Louisville. Four years later, in 1970, he finished his Ph.D. in the program in Biology at the City University of New York.
