= Faraday efficiency =

Efficiency of charge transfer in an electrochemical reaction

In electrochemistry, Faraday efficiency (also called faradaic efficiency, faradaic yield, coulombic efficiency, or current efficiency) describes the efficiency with which charge (electrons) is transferred in a system facilitating an electrochemical reaction. The word "Faraday" in this term has two interrelated aspects: first, the historic unit for charge is the faraday (F), but has since been replaced by the coulomb (C); and secondly, the related Faraday's constant (F) correlates charge with moles of matter and electrons (amount of substance). This phenomenon was originally understood through Michael Faraday's work and expressed in his laws of electrolysis.

== Sources of faradaic loss ==
Faradaic losses are experienced by both electrolytic and galvanic cells when electrons or ions participate in unwanted side reactions. These losses appear as heat and/or chemical byproducts.

An example can be found in the oxidation of water to oxygen at the positive electrode in electrolysis. Hydrogen peroxide can also be produced. The fraction of electrons so diverted represent a faradaic loss and vary in different apparatus.

Even when the proper electrolysis products are produced, losses can still occur if the products are permitted to recombine. During water electrolysis, the desired products (H_{2} and O_{2}), could recombine to form water. This could realistically happen in the presence of catalytic materials such as platinum or palladium commonly used as electrodes. Failure to account for this Faraday-efficiency effect has been identified as the cause of the misidentification of positive results in cold fusion experiments.

Proton exchange membrane fuel cells provide another example of faradaic losses when some of the electrons separated from hydrogen at the anode leak through the membrane and reach the cathode directly instead of passing through the load and performing useful work. Ideally, the electrolyte membrane would be a perfect insulator and prevent this from happening.

An especially familiar example of faradaic loss is the self-discharge that limits battery shelf-life.

== Methods of measuring faradaic loss ==
Faradaic efficiency of a cell design is usually measured through bulk electrolysis where a known quantity of reagent is stoichiometrically converted to product, as measured by the current passed. This result is then compared to the observed quantity of product measured through another analytical method.

== Faradaic loss vs. voltage and energy efficiency ==
Faradaic loss is only one form of energy loss in an electrochemical system. Another is overpotential, the difference between the theoretical and actual electrode voltages needed to drive the reaction at the desired rate. Even a rechargeable battery with 100% faradaic efficiency requires charging at a higher voltage than it produces during discharge, so its overall energy efficiency is the product of voltage efficiency and faradaic efficiency. Voltage efficiencies below 100% reflect the thermodynamic irreversibility of every real-world chemical reaction.
