= Tadahiko =

- Gender: Male

Origin
- Origin: Japanese
- Meaning: Different meanings depending on the kanji used

Tadahiko (written: 忠彦) is a masculine Japanese given name. Notable people with the name include:

- Tadahiko Hayashi (林 忠彦; 1918–1990), Japanese photographer
- Tadahiko Ito (伊藤 忠彦; born 1964), Japanese politician
- Tadahiko Mibuchi (三淵 忠彦; 1880–1950), Japanese judge
- Tadahiko Mizuno (水野 忠彦; born 1945), Japanese chemist
- Tadahiko Ogawa, Japanese artist
- Tadahiko Okada (岡田 忠彦; 1878–1958), Japanese politician
- Tadahiko Taira (平 忠彦; born 1956), Japanese motorcycle racer
- Tadahiko Ueda (上田 忠彦; born 1947), Japanese footballer
