= Giuliano Preparata =

Italian physicist

- Born: 10 March 1942; Padua
- Died: 24 April 2000 (aged 58); Frascati
- Education: High School Umperto I (graduated in 1964)
- Known for: Physics

Giuliano Preparata (10 March 1942, Padua – 24 April 2000, Frascati) was an Italian physicist.

== Biography ==
He attended the High School Umberto I of Rome (the same as Enrico Fermi), and graduated in theoretical physics with honors in 1964. The following year he was in Florence with a CNR grant, later to become appointed as Professor. From 1967 to 1972 he was a research associate at several prestigious universities in the United States, including Princeton, Harvard, and NYU. From 1974 to 1980 he was a staff member in the theory division of CERN, in Geneva.

Preparata dedicated a great part of his scientific activity to high energy physics, giving fundamental contributions to the construction of the Standard Model, the new synthesis of the subnuclear interactions. In particular, he clarified the nature of the Dirac quantum field of quarks, a fundamental premise for the electroweak unification, and he proposed a solution to the crucial problem of colour confinement in quantum chromodynamics (QCD), based on a non-perturbative analysis of the ground state of QCD. His analysis reveals the existence of a non-trivial ground state of QCD and constitutes an important step forward in our understanding of interacting quantum fields. From 1987 his attention turned to problems in the field of condensed matter and to nuclear physics, that he tackled armed with the picture of Quantum Field Theory. Preparata discovered that condensed matter systems, when both at sufficiently low temperatures and high densities will spontaneously develop new coherent solutions of quantum electrodynamics (QED). This allowed him to face old problems, like liquid water theory, and new ones, like cold fusion, from a completely new point of view. Moreover, along with Cecilia Saccone (Molecular Biology Professor of University of Bari), Preparata developed a Markov model of molecular evolution. He published approximately 400 papers in such diverse fields as subnuclear physics, nuclear physics, physics of lasers, superconductivity, superfluidity, liquid and solid water, condensed matter (glasses, colloids, electrolytes, etc.), physics of neutron stars, astrophysics of Gamma ray bursts, and cold fusion. A fierce and stubborn character, Preparata often encountered open ostracism from his peers.

He liked to reconnect his ideas in theoretical physics to those of Realism.

In his last years he taught at the Department of Physics, University of Milan, Italy, where he was most influential on a generation of young physicists. He died in Frascati in 2000.

== The Giuliano Preparata Award ==
In 2003, a series of silver medals were minted to commemorate Giuliano Preparata. In June 2004, this stock of Giuliano Preparata Medals was donated to ISCMNS (The International Society for Condensed Matter Nuclear Science) which administers them through The Giuliano Preparata Award Committee. The "Awards" are presented to those individuals who are making or have made an outstanding contribution in the field of Condensed Matter Nuclear Science (CMNS). The "Awards" are also known as The International Society for Condensed Matter Nuclear Science Prizes. In recent years, the “Awards” are typically presented to the recipients at International Conference on Condensed Matter Nuclear Science also known as the “ICCF”.

== The Preparata Lecture ==
Giuliano Preparata had also a strong interest in topics related to Biology, and gave important and enlightening contributions to the field of Bioinformatics. The Italian Society of Bioinformatics (BITS) starts each year its Annual Conference with the "Preparata Lecture", delivered by a distinguished keynote speaker. Over the years, the Society, thanks to the contribution of the Preparata Foundation, also delivered Travel Grants to young researchers for the participation to BITS Annual Conferences.

== Books ==
- "Probing Hadrons with Leptons", Plenum Press, 1980
- "QED Coherence in Matter", World Scientific, 1995
- "An Introduction to a Realistic Quantum Physics", World Scientific, 2002
- "L'architettura dell'universo : Lezioni popolari di fine secolo su ciò che la scienza è riuscita a capire sulla struttura Dell'Universo", Bibliopolis, 2001
- "Dai quark ai cristalli : Breve storia di un lungo viaggio dentro la materia", Bollati Boringhieri, 2002

== See also ==
- Emilio Del Giudice
