= Cold fusion =

Hypothetical type of nuclear reaction

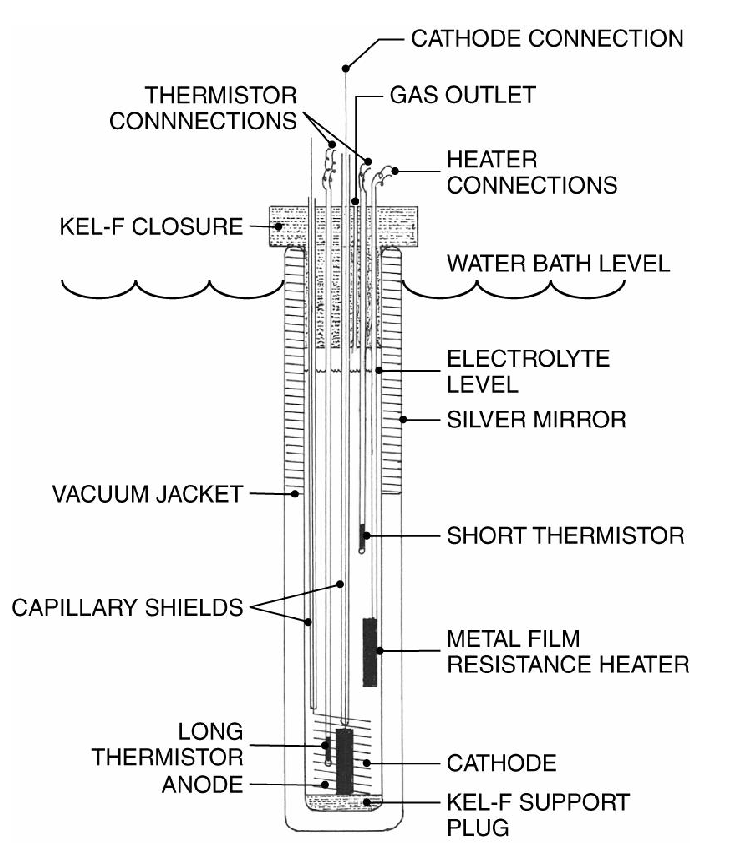
Diagram of an open-type calorimeter used at the New Hydrogen Energy Institute in Japan

Cold fusion is a hypothesized type of nuclear reaction that would occur at, or near, room temperature. It would contrast starkly with the "hot" fusion that is known to take place naturally within stars, artificially in hydrogen bombs, and within prototype fusion reactors; all of which occur at temperatures of millions of degrees. It is also distinguished from muon-catalyzed fusion. There is currently no accepted theoretical model that describes how cold fusion could occur.

In 1989, two electrochemists at the University of Utah, Martin Fleischmann and Stanley Pons, reported that their apparatus containing heavy water had produced anomalous heat ("excess heat") of a magnitude they asserted would defy explanation except in terms of nuclear processes. They further reported measuring small amounts of nuclear reaction byproducts, including neutrons and tritium, both of which are produced by fusion of deuterium, found in heavy water (see Fusion power § Deuterium). The small tabletop experiment involved electrolysis of heavy water on the surface of a palladium (Pd) electrode. The reported results received wide media attention and raised hopes of a cheap and abundant source of energy. Both neutrons and tritium are found in trace amounts from natural sources. These traces are produced by cosmic ray interactions and nuclear radioactive decays occurring in the atmosphere and the earth.

Many scientists tried to replicate the experiment with the few details available. Expectations diminished as a result of numerous failed replications, the retraction of several previously reported positive replications, and the identification of methodological flaws and experimental errors in the original study. By late 1989, most scientists considered cold fusion claims dead, and cold fusion subsequently gained a reputation as pathological science. In 1989 the United States Department of Energy (DOE) concluded that the reported results of excess heat did not present convincing evidence of a useful source of energy and decided against allocating funding specifically for cold fusion. A second DOE review in 2004, which looked at new research, reached similar conclusions and did not result in DOE funding of cold fusion. Presently, since articles about cold fusion are rarely published in peer-reviewed mainstream scientific journals, they do not attract the level of scrutiny expected for mainstream scientific publications.

Some interest in cold fusion has continued through the decades—for example, a Google-funded failed replication attempt was published in a 2019 issue of Nature. A small community of researchers continues to investigate it, often under the alternative designations low-energy nuclear reactions (LENR) or condensed matter nuclear science (CMNS).

== History ==
Nuclear fusion is normally understood to occur at temperatures in the tens of millions of degrees. This is called "thermonuclear fusion". Since the 1920s, there has been speculation that nuclear fusion might be possible at much lower temperatures by catalytically fusing hydrogen absorbed in a metal catalyst. In 1989, a claim by Stanley Pons and Martin Fleischmann (then one of the world's leading electrochemists) that such cold fusion had been observed caused a brief media sensation before the majority of scientists criticized their claim as incorrect after many found they could not replicate the excess heat. Since the initial announcement, cold fusion research has continued by a small community of researchers who believe that such reactions happen and hope to gain wider recognition for their experimental evidence.

=== Early research ===
The ability of palladium to absorb hydrogen was recognized as early as the nineteenth century by Thomas Graham. In the late 1920s, two Austrian-born scientists, Friedrich Paneth and Kurt Peters, originally reported the transformation of hydrogen into helium by nuclear catalysis when hydrogen was absorbed by finely divided palladium at room temperature. However, the authors later retracted that report, saying that the helium they measured was due to background from the air.

In 1927, Swedish scientist John Tandberg reported that he had fused hydrogen into helium in an electrolytic cell with palladium electrodes. On the basis of his work, he applied for a Swedish patent for "a method to produce helium and useful reaction energy". Due to Paneth and Peters's retraction and his inability to explain the physical process, his patent application was denied. After deuterium was discovered in 1932, Tandberg continued his experiments with heavy water. The final experiments made by Tandberg with heavy water were similar to the original experiment by Fleischmann and Pons. Fleischmann and Pons were not aware of Tandberg's work. (Note: Taubes 1993, p. 214 says the similarity was discovered on 13 April 1991, by a computer scientist and disseminated via the Internet. Another computer scientist translated an old article in the Swedish technical journal Ny Teknika. Taubes says: "Ny Teknika seemed to believe that Tandberg had missed on the discovery of the century, done in by an ignorant patent bureau. When Pons heard the story, he agreed.") (Note: Brigham Young University discovered Tandberg's 1927 patent application, and showed it as proof that Utah University didn't have priority for the discovery of cold fusion, cited in Wilford 1989)

The term "cold fusion" was used as early as 1956 in an article in The New York Times about Luis Alvarez's work on muon-catalyzed fusion. Paul Palmer and then Steven Jones of Brigham Young University used the term "cold fusion" in 1986 in an investigation of "geo-fusion", the possible existence of fusion involving hydrogen isotopes in a planetary core. In his original paper on this subject with Clinton Van Siclen, submitted in 1985, Jones had coined the term "piezonuclear fusion".

=== Fleischmann–Pons experiment ===
The most famous cold fusion claims were made by Stanley Pons and Martin Fleischmann in 1989. After a brief period of interest by the wider scientific community, their reports were called into question by nuclear physicists. Pons and Fleischmann never retracted their claims, but moved their research program from the US to France after the controversy erupted.

==== Events preceding announcement ====
Electrolysis cell schematic

Martin Fleischmann of the University of Southampton and Stanley Pons of the University of Utah hypothesized that the high compression ratio and mobility of deuterium that could be achieved within palladium metal using electrolysis might result in nuclear fusion. To investigate, they conducted electrolysis experiments using a palladium cathode and heavy water within a calorimeter, an insulated vessel designed to measure process heat. Current was applied continuously for many weeks, with the heavy water being renewed at intervals. Some deuterium was thought to be accumulating within the cathode, but most was allowed to bubble out of the cell, joining oxygen produced at the anode. For most of the time, the power input to the cell was equal to the calculated power leaving the cell within measurement accuracy, and the cell temperature was stable at around 30 °C. But then, at some point (in some of the experiments), the temperature rose suddenly to about 50 °C without changes in the input power. These high temperature phases would last for two days or more and would repeat several times in any given experiment once they had occurred. The calculated power leaving the cell was significantly higher than the input power during these high temperature phases. Eventually the high temperature phases would no longer occur within a particular cell.

In 1988, Fleischmann and Pons applied to the United States Department of Energy for funding towards a larger series of experiments. Up to this point they had been funding their experiments using a small device built with $100,000 out-of-pocket. The grant proposal was turned over for peer review, and one of the reviewers was Steven Jones of Brigham Young University. Jones had worked for some time on muon-catalyzed fusion, a known method of inducing nuclear fusion without high temperatures, and had written an article on the topic entitled "Cold nuclear fusion" that had been published in Scientific American in July 1987. Fleischmann and Pons and co-workers met with Jones and co-workers on occasion in Utah to share research and techniques. During this time, Fleischmann and Pons described their experiments as generating considerable "excess energy", in the sense that it could not be explained by chemical reactions alone. They felt that such a discovery could bear significant commercial value and would be entitled to patent protection. Jones, however, was measuring neutron flux, which was not of commercial interest. To avoid future problems, the teams appeared to agree to publish their results simultaneously, though their accounts of their 6 March meeting differ.

==== Announcement ====
In mid-March 1989, both research teams were ready to publish their findings, and Fleischmann and Jones had agreed to meet at an airport on 24 March to send their papers to Nature via FedEx. Fleischmann and Pons, however, pressured by the University of Utah, which wanted to establish priority on the discovery, broke their apparent agreement, disclosing their work at a press conference on 23 March (they claimed in the press release that it would be published in Nature but instead submitted their paper to the Journal of Electroanalytical Chemistry). Jones, upset, faxed in his paper to Nature after the press conference.

Fleischmann and Pons' announcement drew wide media attention, (Note: For example, in 1989, the Economist editorialized that the cold fusion "affair" was "exactly what science should be about.") as well as attention from the scientific community. The 1986 discovery of high-temperature superconductivity had made scientists more open to revelations of unexpected but potentially momentous scientific results that could be replicated reliably even if they could not be explained by established theories. Many scientists were also reminded of the Mössbauer effect, a process involving nuclear transitions in a solid. Its discovery 30 years earlier had also been unexpected, though it was quickly replicated and explained within the existing physics framework.

The announcement of a new purported clean source of energy came at a crucial time: adults still remembered the 1973 oil crisis and the problems caused by oil dependence, anthropogenic global warming was starting to become notorious, the anti-nuclear movement was labeling nuclear power plants as dangerous and getting them closed, people had in mind the consequences of strip mining, acid rain, the greenhouse effect and the Exxon Valdez oil spill, which happened the day after the announcement. In the press conference, Chase N. Peterson, Fleischmann and Pons, backed by the solidity of their scientific credentials, repeatedly assured the journalists that cold fusion would solve environmental problems, and would provide a limitless inexhaustible source of clean energy, using only seawater as fuel. They said the results had been confirmed dozens of times and they had no doubts about them. In the accompanying press release Fleischmann was quoted saying: "What we have done is to open the door of a new research area, our indications are that the discovery will be relatively easy to make into a usable technology for generating heat and power, but continued work is needed, first, to further understand the science and secondly, to determine its value to energy economics."

==== Response and fallout ====
Although the experimental protocol had not been published, physicists in several countries attempted, and failed, to replicate the excess heat phenomenon. The first paper submitted to Nature reproducing excess heat, although it passed peer review, was rejected because most similar experiments were negative and there were no theories that could explain a positive result; (Note: On 26 January 1990, journal Nature rejected Oriani's paper, citing the lack of nuclear ash and the general difficulty that others had in replication.Beaudette 2002, p. 183 It was later published in Fusion Technology.Oriani et al. 1990, pp. 652–662) this paper was later accepted for publication by the journal Fusion Technology.

Nathan Lewis, professor of chemistry at the California Institute of Technology, led one of the most ambitious validation efforts, trying many variations on the experiment without success, while CERN physicist Douglas R. O. Morrison said that "essentially all" attempts in Western Europe had failed. Even those reporting success had difficulty reproducing Fleischmann and Pons' results. On 10 April 1989, a group at Texas A&M University published results of excess heat and later that day a group at the Georgia Institute of Technology announced neutron production—the strongest replication announced up to that point due to the detection of neutrons and the reputation of the lab. On 12 April Pons was acclaimed at an ACS meeting. But Georgia Tech retracted their announcement on 13 April, explaining that their neutron detectors gave false positives when exposed to heat.

Another attempt at independent replication, headed by Robert Huggins at Stanford University, which also reported early success with a light water control, became the only scientific support for cold fusion in 26 April US Congress hearings. (Note: Taubes 1993, pp. 225–226, 229–231 "[p. 225] Like those of MIT or Harvard or Caltech, and official Stanford University announcement is not something to be taken lightly. (...) [p. 230] With the news out of Stanford, the situation, as one Department of Energy official put it, 'had come to a head'. The department had had its laboratory administrators send emissaries to Washington immediately. (...) the secretary of energy, had made the pursuit of cold fusion the department's highest priority (...) The government laboratories had free reign [sic] to pursue their cold fusion research, Ianniello said, to use whatever resources they needed, and DOE would cover the expenses. (...) [p. 231] While Huggins may have appeared to be the savior of cold fusion, his results also made him, and Stanford, a prime competitor [of MIT] for patents and rights.", Close 1992, pp. 184, 250 "[p. 184] The only support for Fleischmann and Pons [at the 26 April US congress hearings] came from Robert Huggins (...) [p. 250] The British Embassy in Washington rushed news of the proceedings to the Cabinet Office and Department of Energy in London. (...) noting that Huggin's heat measurements lent some support but that he had not checked for radiation, and also emphasizing that none of the US government laboratories had yet managed to replicate the effect.", Huizenga 1993, p. 56 "Of the above speakers (in the US Congress hearings) only Huggins supported the Fleischmann-Pons claim of excess heat.") But when he finally presented his results he reported an excess heat of only one degree Celsius, a result that could be explained by chemical differences between heavy and light water in the presence of lithium. (Note: Taubes 1993, pp. 228–229, 255 "(...) there are indeed chemical differences between heavy and light water, especially once lithium is added, as it was in the Pons-Fleischmann electrolyte. This had been in the scientific literature since 1958. It seems that the electrical conductivity of heavy water with lithium is considerably less than that of light water with lithium. And this difference is more than enough to account for the heavy water cell running hotter (...) (quoting a member of the A&M group) 'they're making the same mistake we did'") He had not tried to measure any radiation and his research was derided by scientists who saw it later. For the next six weeks, competing claims, counterclaims, and suggested explanations kept what was referred to as "cold fusion" or "fusion confusion" in the news.

In April 1989, Fleischmann and Pons published a "preliminary note" in the Journal of Electroanalytical Chemistry. This paper notably showed a gamma peak without its corresponding Compton edge, which indicated they had made a mistake in claiming evidence of fusion byproducts. Fleischmann and Pons replied to this critique, but the only thing left clear was that no gamma ray had been registered and that Fleischmann refused to recognize any mistakes in the data. A much longer paper published a year later went into details of calorimetry but did not include any nuclear measurements.

Nevertheless, Fleischmann and Pons and a number of other researchers who found positive results remained convinced of their findings. The University of Utah asked Congress to provide $25 million to pursue the research, and Pons was scheduled to meet with representatives of President Bush in early May.

On 30 April 1989, cold fusion was declared dead by The New York Times. The Times called it a circus the same day, and the Boston Herald attacked cold fusion the following day.

On 1 May 1989, the American Physical Society held a session on cold fusion in Baltimore, including many reports of experiments that failed to produce evidence of cold fusion. At the end of the session, eight of the nine leading speakers stated that they considered the initial Fleischmann and Pons claim dead, with the ninth, Johann Rafelski, abstaining. Steven E. Koonin of Caltech called the Utah report a result of "the incompetence and delusion of Pons and Fleischmann," which was met with a standing ovation. Douglas R. O. Morrison, a physicist representing CERN, was the first to call the episode an example of pathological science. On 4 May, due to all this new criticism, the meetings with various representatives from Washington were cancelled.

From 8 May, only the A&M tritium results kept cold fusion afloat.

In July and November 1989, Nature published papers critical of cold fusion claims. Negative results were also published in several other scientific journals including Science, Physical Review Letters, and Physical Review C (nuclear physics). In August 1989, in spite of this trend, the state of Utah invested $4.5 million to create the National Cold Fusion Institute.

The United States Department of Energy organized a special panel to review cold fusion theory and research. The panel issued its report in November 1989, concluding that results as of that date did not present convincing evidence that useful sources of energy would result from the phenomena attributed to cold fusion. The panel noted the large number of failures to replicate excess heat and the greater inconsistency of reports of nuclear reaction byproducts expected by established conjecture. Nuclear fusion of the type postulated would be inconsistent with current understanding and, if verified, would require established conjecture, perhaps even theory itself, to be extended in an unexpected way. The panel was against special funding for cold fusion research, but supported modest funding of "focused experiments within the general funding system".

Cold fusion supporters continued to argue that the evidence for excess heat was strong, and in September 1990 the National Cold Fusion Institute listed 92 groups of researchers from 10 countries that had reported corroborating evidence of excess heat, but they refused to provide any evidence of their own arguing that it could endanger their patents. However, no further DOE nor NSF funding resulted from the panel's recommendation. By this point, academic consensus had moved decidedly toward labeling cold fusion as a kind of "pathological science".

In March 1990, Michael H. Salamon, a physicist from the University of Utah, and nine co-authors reported negative results. University faculty were then "stunned" when a lawyer representing Pons and Fleischmann demanded the Salamon paper be retracted under threat of a lawsuit. The lawyer later apologized; Fleischmann defended the threat as a legitimate reaction to alleged bias displayed by cold-fusion critics.

In early May 1990, one of the two A&M researchers, Kevin Wolf, acknowledged the possibility of spiking, but said that the most likely explanation was tritium contamination in the palladium electrodes or simply contamination due to sloppy work. In June 1990 an article in Science by science writer Gary Taubes destroyed the public credibility of the A&M tritium results when it accused its group leader John Bockris and one of his graduate students of spiking the cells with tritium. In October 1990 Wolf finally said that the results were explained by tritium contamination in the rods. An A&M cold fusion review panel found that the tritium evidence was not convincing and that, while they couldn't rule out spiking, contamination and measurements problems were more likely explanations, (Note: Taubes 1993, pp. 418–420 "While it is not possible for us to categorically exclude spiking as a possibility, it is our opinion, that possibility is much less probable than that of inadvertent contamination or other explained factors in the measurements.", Huizenga 1993, pp. 128–129) and Bockris never got support from his faculty to resume his research.

On 30 June 1991, the National Cold Fusion Institute closed after it ran out of funds; it found no excess heat, and its reports of tritium production were met with indifference.

On 1 January 1991, Pons left the University of Utah and went to Europe. In 1992, Pons and Fleischmann resumed research with Toyota's IMRA lab in France. Fleischmann left for England in 1995, and the contract with Pons was not renewed in 1998 after spending $40 million with no tangible results. The IMRA laboratory stopped cold fusion research in 1998 after spending £12 million. Pons has made no public declarations since, and only Fleischmann continued giving talks and publishing papers.

Mostly in the 1990s, several books were published that were critical of cold fusion research methods and the conduct of cold fusion researchers. Over the years, several books have appeared that defended them. Around 1998, the University of Utah had already dropped its research after spending over $1 million, and in the summer of 1997, Japan cut off research and closed its own lab after spending $20 million.

== Later research ==
A 1991 review by a cold fusion proponent had calculated "about 600 scientists" were still conducting research. After 1991, cold fusion research only continued in relative obscurity, conducted by groups that had increasing difficulty securing public funding and keeping programs open. These small but committed groups of cold fusion researchers have continued to conduct experiments using Fleischmann and Pons electrolysis setups in spite of the rejection by the mainstream community. The Boston Globe estimated in 2004 that there were only 100 to 200 researchers working in the field, most suffering damage to their reputation and career. Since the main controversy over Pons and Fleischmann had ended, cold fusion research has been funded by private and small governmental scientific investment funds in the United States, Italy, Japan, and India. For example, it was reported in Nature, in May, 2019, that Google had spent approximately $10 million on cold fusion research. A group of scientists at well-known research labs (e.g., MIT, Lawrence Berkeley National Lab, and others) worked for several years to establish experimental protocols and measurement techniques in an effort to re-evaluate cold fusion to a high standard of scientific rigor. Their reported conclusion: no cold fusion.

In 2021, following Nature's 2019 publication of anomalous findings that might only be explained by some localized fusion, scientists at the Naval Surface Warfare Center, Indian Head Division announced that they had assembled a group of scientists from the Navy, Army and National Institute of Standards and Technology to undertake a new, coordinated study. With few exceptions, researchers have had difficulty publishing in mainstream journals. The remaining researchers often term their field Low Energy Nuclear Reactions (LENR), Chemically Assisted Nuclear Reactions (CANR), Lattice Assisted Nuclear Reactions (LANR), Condensed Matter Nuclear Science (CMNS) or Lattice Enabled Nuclear Reactions; one of the reasons being to avoid the negative connotations associated with "cold fusion". The new names avoid making bold implications, like implying that fusion is actually occurring.

The researchers who continue their investigations acknowledge that the flaws in the original announcement are the main cause of the subject's marginalization, and they complain of a chronic lack of funding and no possibilities of getting their work published in the highest impact journals. University researchers are often unwilling to investigate cold fusion because they would be ridiculed by their colleagues and their professional careers would be at risk. In 1994, David Goodstein, a professor of physics at Caltech, advocated increased attention from mainstream researchers and described cold fusion as:

A pariah field, cast out by the scientific establishment. Between cold fusion and respectable science there is virtually no communication at all. Cold fusion papers are almost never published in refereed scientific journals, with the result that those works don't receive the normal critical scrutiny that science requires. On the other hand, because the Cold-Fusioners see themselves as a community under siege, there is little internal criticism. Experiments and theories tend to be accepted at face value, for fear of providing even more fuel for external critics, if anyone outside the group was bothering to listen. In these circumstances, crackpots flourish, making matters worse for those who believe that there is serious science going on here.

=== United States ===
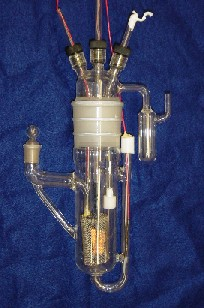
Cold fusion apparatus at the Space and Naval Warfare Systems Center San Diego (2005)

United States Navy researchers at the Space and Naval Warfare Systems Center (SPAWAR) in San Diego have been studying cold fusion since 1989. In 2002 they released a two-volume report, "Thermal and nuclear aspects of the Pd/D_{2}O system", with a plea for funding. This and other published papers prompted a 2004 Department of Energy (DOE) review.

==== 2004 DOE panel ====
In August 2003, the U.S. Secretary of Energy, Spencer Abraham, ordered the DOE to organize a second review of the field. This was thanks to an April 2003 letter sent by MIT's Peter L. Hagelstein, and the publication of many new papers, including the Italian ENEA and other researchers in the 2003 International Cold Fusion Conference, and a two-volume book by U.S. SPAWAR in 2002. Cold fusion researchers were asked to present a review document of all the evidence since the 1989 review. The report was released in 2004. The reviewers were "split approximately evenly" on whether the experiments had produced energy in the form of heat, but "most reviewers, even those who accepted the evidence for excess power production, 'stated that the effects are not repeatable, the magnitude of the effect has not increased in over a decade of work, and that many of the reported experiments were not well documented'". In summary, reviewers found that cold fusion evidence was still not convincing 15 years later, and they did not recommend a federal research program. They only recommended that agencies consider funding individual well-thought studies in specific areas where research "could be helpful in resolving some of the controversies in the field". They summarized its conclusions thus:

While significant progress has been made in the sophistication of calorimeters since the review of this subject in 1989, the conclusions reached by the reviewers today are similar to those found in the 1989 review.

The current reviewers identified a number of basic science research areas that could be helpful in resolving some of the controversies in the field, two of which were: 1) material science aspects of deuterated metals using modern characterization techniques, and 2) the study of particles reportedly emitted from deuterated foils using state-of-the-art apparatus and methods. The reviewers believed that this field would benefit from the peer-review processes associated with proposal submission to agencies and paper submission to archival journals.

— Report of the Review of Low Energy Nuclear Reactions, US Department of Energy, December 2004

Cold fusion researchers placed a "rosier spin" on the report, noting that they were finally being treated like normal scientists, and that the report had increased interest in the field and caused "a huge upswing in interest in funding cold fusion research". However, in a 2009 BBC article on an American Chemical Society's meeting on cold fusion, particle physicist Frank Close was quoted stating that the problems that plagued the original cold fusion announcement were still happening: results from studies are still not being independently verified and inexplicable phenomena encountered are being labelled as "cold fusion" even if they are not, in order to attract the attention of journalists.

In February 2012, millionaire Sidney Kimmel, convinced that cold fusion was worth investing in by a 19 April 2009 interview with physicist Robert Duncan on the US news show 60 Minutes, made a grant of $5.5 million to the University of Missouri to establish the Sidney Kimmel Institute for Nuclear Renaissance (SKINR). The grant was intended to support research into the interactions of hydrogen with palladium, nickel or platinum under extreme conditions. In March 2013 Graham K. Hubler, a nuclear physicist who worked for the Naval Research Laboratory for 40 years, was named director. One of the SKINR projects is to replicate a 1991 experiment in which a professor associated with the project, Mark Prelas, says bursts of millions of neutrons a second were recorded, which was stopped because "his research account had been frozen". He claims that the new experiment has already seen "neutron emissions at similar levels to the 1991 observation".

In May 2016, the United States House Committee on Armed Services, in its report on the 2017 National Defense Authorization Act, directed the Secretary of Defense to "provide a briefing on the military utility of recent U.S. industrial base LENR advancements to the House Committee on Armed Services by September 22, 2016".

=== Italy ===
Since the Fleischmann and Pons announcement, the Italian national agency for new technologies, energy and sustainable economic development (ENEA) has funded Franco Scaramuzzi's research into whether excess heat can be measured from metals loaded with deuterium gas. Such research is distributed across ENEA departments, CNR laboratories, INFN, universities, and industrial laboratories in Italy, where the group continues to try to achieve reliable reproducibility (i.e. getting the phenomenon to happen in every cell, and inside a certain frame of time). In 2006–2007, the ENEA started a research program which claimed to have found excess power of up to 500 percent, and in 2009, ENEA hosted the 15th cold fusion conference.

=== Japan ===
Between 1992 and 1997, Japan's Ministry of International Trade and Industry sponsored a "New Hydrogen Energy (NHE)" program of US$20 million to research cold fusion. Announcing the end of the program in 1997, the director and one-time proponent of cold fusion research Hideo Ikegami stated "We couldn't achieve what was first claimed in terms of cold fusion. (...) We can't find any reason to propose more money for the coming year or for the future." In 1999 the Japan C-F Research Society was established to promote the independent research into cold fusion that continued in Japan. The society holds annual meetings. Perhaps the most famous Japanese cold fusion researcher was Yoshiaki Arata, from Osaka University, who claimed in a demonstration to produce excess heat when deuterium gas was introduced into a cell containing a mixture of palladium and zirconium oxide, (Note: "Physicist Claims First Real Demonstration of Cold Fusion", Physorg.com, 27 May 2008, archived from the original on 15 March 2012. The peer reviewed papers referenced at the end of the article are "The Establishment of Solid Nuclear Fusion Reactor" – Journal of High Temperature Society, Vol. 34 (2008), No. 2, pp.85–93 and "Atomic Structure Analysis of Pd Nano-Cluster in Nano-Composite Pd/ZrO2 Absorbing Deuterium" – Journal of High Temperature Society, Vol. 33 (2007), No. 3, pp.142–156) a claim supported by fellow Japanese researcher Akira Kitamura of Kobe University and Michael McKubre at SRI.

=== India ===
In the 1990s, India stopped its research in cold fusion at the Bhabha Atomic Research Centre because of the lack of consensus among mainstream scientists and the US denunciation of the research. Yet, in 2008, the National Institute of Advanced Studies recommended that the Indian government revive this research. Projects were commenced at Chennai's Indian Institute of Technology, the Bhabha Atomic Research Centre and the Indira Gandhi Centre for Atomic Research. However, there is still skepticism among scientists and, for all practical purposes, research has stalled since the 1990s. A special section in the Indian multidisciplinary journal Current Science published 33 cold fusion papers in 2015 by major cold fusion researchers including several Indian researchers. A Hyderabad-based startup, Hylenr Technologies, showcased the amplification of electrical energy into significantly more heat energy using the a LENR system. The startup is being guided by a former DRDO scientist, Padma Shri awardee, Dr. Prahlada Ramarao.

== Reported results ==
A cold fusion experiment usually includes:

- a metal, such as palladium or nickel, in bulk, thin films or powder; and
- deuterium, hydrogen, or both, in the form of water, gas or plasma.

Electrolysis cells can be either open cell or closed cell. In open cell systems, the electrolysis products, which are gaseous, are allowed to leave the cell. In closed cell experiments, the products are captured, for example by catalytically recombining the products in a separate part of the experimental system. These experiments generally strive for a steady state condition, with the electrolyte being replaced periodically. There are also "heat-after-death" experiments, where the evolution of heat is monitored after the electric current is turned off.

The most basic setup of a cold fusion cell consists of two electrodes submerged in a solution containing palladium and heavy water. The electrodes are then connected to a power source to transmit electricity from one electrode to the other through the solution. Even when anomalous heat is reported, it can take weeks for it to begin to appear—this is known as the "loading time," the time required to saturate the palladium electrode with hydrogen (see "Loading ratio" section).

The Fleischmann and Pons early findings regarding helium, neutron radiation and tritium were never replicated satisfactorily, and its levels were too low for the claimed heat production and inconsistent with each other. Neutron radiation has been reported in cold fusion experiments at very low levels using different kinds of detectors, but levels were too low, close to background, and found too infrequently to provide useful information about possible nuclear processes.

=== Excess heat and energy production ===
An excess heat observation is based on an energy balance. Various sources of energy input and output are continuously measured. Under normal conditions, the energy input can be matched to the energy output to within experimental error. In experiments such as those run by Fleischmann and Pons, an electrolysis cell operating steadily at one temperature transitions to operating at a higher temperature with no increase in applied current. If the higher temperatures were real, and not an experimental artifact, the energy balance would show an unaccounted term. In the Fleischmann and Pons experiments, the rate of inferred excess heat generation was in the range of 10–20% of total input, though this could not be reliably replicated by most researchers. Researcher Nathan Lewis discovered that the excess heat in Fleischmann and Pons's original paper was not measured, but estimated from measurements that didn't have any excess heat.

Unable to produce excess heat or neutrons, and with positive experiments being plagued by errors and giving disparate results, most researchers declared that heat production was not a real effect and ceased working on the experiments. In 1993, after their original report, Fleischmann reported "heat-after-death" experiments—where excess heat was measured after the electric current supplied to the electrolytic cell was turned off. This type of report has also become part of subsequent cold fusion claims.

=== Helium, heavy elements, and neutrons ===
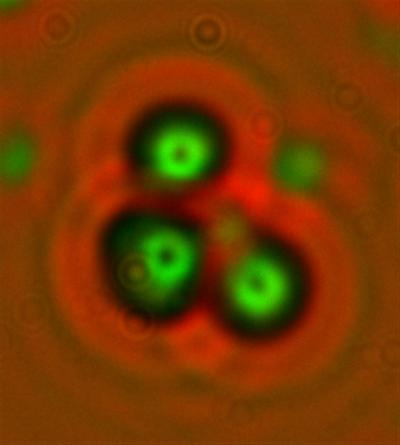
"Triple tracks" in a CR-39 plastic radiation detector claimed as evidence for neutron emission from palladium deuteride

Known instances of nuclear reactions, aside from producing energy, also produce nucleons and particles on readily observable ballistic trajectories. In support of their claim that nuclear reactions took place in their electrolytic cells, Fleischmann and Pons reported a neutron flux of 4,000 neutrons per second, as well as detection of tritium. The classical branching ratio for previously known fusion reactions that produce tritium would predict, with 1 watt of power, the production of 10^{12} neutrons per second, levels that would have been fatal to the researchers. In 2009, Mosier-Boss et al. reported what they called the first scientific report of highly energetic neutrons, using CR-39 plastic radiation detectors, but the claims cannot be validated without a quantitative analysis of neutrons.

Several medium and heavy elements like calcium, titanium, chromium, manganese, iron, cobalt, copper and zinc have been reported as detected by several researchers, like Tadahiko Mizuno or George Miley. The report presented to the United States Department of Energy (DOE) in 2004 indicated that deuterium-loaded foils could be used to detect fusion reaction products and, although the reviewers found the evidence presented to them as inconclusive, they indicated that those experiments did not use state-of-the-art techniques.

- In response to doubts about the lack of nuclear products, cold fusion researchers have tried to capture and measure nuclear products correlated with excess heat. Considerable attention has been given to measuring ^{4}He production. However, the reported levels are very near to background, so contamination by trace amounts of helium normally present in the air cannot be ruled out. In the report presented to the DOE in 2004, the reviewers' opinion was divided on the evidence for ^{4}He, with the most negative reviews concluding that although the amounts detected were above background levels, they were very close to them and therefore could be caused by contamination from air.

One of the main criticisms of cold fusion was that deuteron-deuteron fusion into helium was expected to result in the production of gamma rays—which were not observed and were not observed in subsequent cold fusion experiments. Cold fusion researchers have since claimed to find X-rays, helium, neutrons and nuclear transmutations. Some researchers also claim to have found them using only light water and nickel cathodes. The 2004 DOE panel expressed concerns about the poor quality of the theoretical framework cold fusion proponents presented to account for the lack of gamma rays.

== Proposed mechanisms ==
Researchers in the field do not agree on a theory for cold fusion. One proposal considers that hydrogen and its isotopes can be absorbed in certain solids, including palladium hydride, at high densities. This creates a high partial pressure, reducing the average separation of hydrogen isotopes. However, the reduction in separation is not enough to create the fusion rates claimed in the original experiment, by a factor of ten. It was also proposed that a higher density of hydrogen inside the palladium and a lower potential barrier could raise the possibility of fusion at lower temperatures than expected from a simple application of Coulomb's law. Electron screening of the positive hydrogen nuclei by the negative electrons in the palladium lattice was suggested to the 2004 DOE commission, but the panel found the theoretical explanations not convincing and inconsistent with current physics theories.

== Criticism ==
Criticism of cold fusion claims generally take one of two forms: either pointing out the theoretical implausibility that fusion reactions have occurred in electrolysis setups or criticizing the excess heat measurements as being spurious, erroneous, or due to poor methodology or controls. There are several reasons why known fusion reactions are an unlikely explanation for the excess heat and associated cold fusion claims. (Note: US DOE 1989, p. 29, Schaffer 1999, pp. 1, 2, Scaramuzzi 2000, p. 4, Close 1992, pp. 265–268 "(...) the equality of the two channels is known to be preserved from high energy through 20 keV and down to about 5 keV. A reason that it is not as well known below this energy because the individual rates are so low. However, the rate is known at room temperature from muon catalysed fusion experiments. (...) theory can even accommodate the subtle variations in the ratio at these low temperatures [below 200 °C, where the first channel predominates due to 'molecular resonance excitation']", Huizenga 1993, pp. 6–7, 35–36, 75, 108–109, 112–114, 118–125, 130, 139, 173, 183, 217–218, 243–245 "[page 7] [the first two branches of the reaction] have been studied over a range of deuteron kinetic energies down to a few kiloelectron volts (keV). (...) [branching ratio] appear to be essentially constant at low energies. There is no reason to think that these branching ratios would be measurably altered for cold fusion. [page 108] The near equality of [the first two reaction branches] has been verified also for muon-catalyzed fusion. [in this case the ratio is 1.4 in favor of the first branch, due to 'the p-wave character of muon capture in muon-catalyzed fusion.']", Goodstein 1994 (explaining Pons and Fleischmann would both be dead if they had produced neutrons in proportion to their measurements of excess heat) ("It has been said . . . three 'miracles' are necessary [for D + D fusion to behave in a way consistent with the reported results of cold fusion experiments]"))

=== Repulsion forces ===
Because nuclei are all positively charged, they strongly repel one another. Normally, in the absence of a catalyst such as a muon, very high kinetic energies are required to overcome this charged repulsion. Extrapolating from known fusion rates, the rate for uncatalyzed fusion at room-temperature energy would be 50 orders of magnitude lower than needed to account for the reported excess heat. In muon-catalyzed fusion there are more fusions because the presence of the muon causes deuterium nuclei to be 207 times closer than in ordinary deuterium gas. But deuterium nuclei inside a palladium lattice are further apart than in deuterium gas, and there should be fewer fusion reactions, not more.

Paneth and Peters in the 1920s already knew that palladium can absorb up to 900 times its own volume of hydrogen gas, storing it at several thousands of times the atmospheric pressure. This led them to believe that they could increase the nuclear fusion rate by simply loading palladium rods with hydrogen gas. Tandberg then tried the same experiment but used electrolysis to make palladium absorb more deuterium and force the deuterium further together inside the rods, thus anticipating the main elements of Fleischmann and Pons' experiment. They all hoped that pairs of hydrogen nuclei would fuse together to form helium, which at the time was needed in Germany to fill zeppelins, but no evidence of helium or of increased fusion rate was ever found.

This was also the belief of geologist Palmer, who convinced Steven Jones that the helium-3 occurring naturally in Earth perhaps came from fusion involving hydrogen isotopes inside catalysts like nickel and palladium. This led their team in 1986 to independently make the same experimental setup as Fleischmann and Pons (a palladium cathode submerged in heavy water, absorbing deuterium via electrolysis). Fleischmann and Pons had much the same belief, but they calculated the pressure to be of 10^{27} atmospheres, when cold fusion experiments achieve a loading ratio of only one to one, which has only between 10,000 and 20,000 atmospheres. (Note: Close 1992, pp. 257–258, Huizenga 1993, pp. 33, 47–48, 79, 99–100, 207, 216 "By comparing cathode charging of deuterium into palladium with gas charging for a D7Pd ratio of unity, one obtains an equivalent pressure of 1.5 × 10^{4} atmospheres, a value more than 20 orders of magnitude (10^{20}) less than the Fleischmann-Pons claimed pressure.", Huizenga also cites US DOE 2004, pp. 33–34 in chapter IV. Materials Characterization: D. 'Relevant' Materials Parameters: 2. Confinement Pressure, which has a similar explanation.) John R. Huizenga says they had misinterpreted the Nernst equation, leading them to believe that there was enough pressure to bring deuterons so close to each other that there would be spontaneous fusions.

=== Lack of expected reaction products ===
Conventional deuteron fusion is a two-step process, in which an unstable high-energy intermediary is formed:

^{2}H + ^{2}H → ^{4}He^{*} + 24 MeV

Experiments have shown only three decay pathways for this excited-state nucleus, with the branching ratio showing the probability that any given intermediate follows a particular pathway. The products formed via these decay pathways are:

^{4}He^{*} → n + ^{3}He + 3.3 MeV (ratio=50%)
^{4}He^{*} → p + ^{3}H + 4.0 MeV (ratio=50%)
^{4}He^{*} → ^{4}He + γ + 24 MeV (ratio=10^{−6})

Only about one in a million of the intermediaries take the third pathway, making its products very rare compared to the other paths. This result is consistent with the predictions of the Bohr model. (Note: Huizenga 1993, pp. 6–7, 35–36 "[page 7] This well established experimental result is consistent with the Bohr model, which predicts that the compound nucleus decays predominantly by particle emission [first two branches], as opposed to radioactive capture [third branch], whenever it is energetically possible.") If 1 watt (6.242 × 10^{18} eV/s) (Note: 1 W = 1 J/s ; 1 J = 6.242 × 10^{18} eV since 1 eV = 1.602 × 10^{−19} joule) were produced from ~2.2575 × 10^{11} deuteron fusions per second, with the known branching ratios, the resulting neutrons and tritium (^{3}H) would be easily measured. Some researchers reported detecting ^{4}He but without the expected neutron or tritium production; such a result would require branching ratios strongly favouring the third pathway, with the actual rates of the first two pathways lower by at least five orders of magnitude than observations from other experiments, directly contradicting both theoretically predicted and observed branching probabilities. Those reports of ^{4}He production did not include detection of gamma rays, which would require the third pathway to have been changed somehow so that gamma rays are no longer emitted.

The known rate of the decay process together with the inter-atomic spacing in a metallic crystal makes heat transfer of the 24 MeV excess energy into the host metal lattice prior to the intermediary's decay inexplicable by conventional understandings of momentum and energy transfer, and even then there would be measurable levels of radiation. Also, experiments indicate that the ratios of deuterium fusion remain constant at different energies. In general, pressure and chemical environment cause only small changes to fusion ratios. An early explanation invoked the Oppenheimer–Phillips process at low energies, but its magnitude was too small to explain the altered ratios.

=== Setup of experiments ===
Cold fusion setups utilize an input power source (to ostensibly provide activation energy), a platinum group electrode, a deuterium or hydrogen source, a calorimeter, and, at times, detectors to look for byproducts such as helium or neutrons. Critics have variously taken issue with each of these aspects and have asserted that there has not yet been a consistent reproduction of claimed cold fusion results in either energy output or byproducts. Some cold fusion researchers who claim that they can consistently measure an excess heat effect have argued that the apparent lack of reproducibility might be attributable to a lack of quality control in the electrode metal or the amount of hydrogen or deuterium loaded in the system. Critics have further taken issue with what they describe as mistakes or errors of interpretation that cold fusion researchers have made in calorimetry analyses and energy budgets.

==== Reproducibility ====
In 1989, after Fleischmann and Pons had made their claims, many research groups tried to reproduce the Fleischmann-Pons experiment, without success. A few other research groups, however, reported successful reproductions of cold fusion during this time. In July 1989, an Indian group from the Bhabha Atomic Research Centre (P. K. Iyengar and M. Srinivasan) and in October 1989, John Bockris' group from Texas A&M University reported on the creation of tritium. In December 1990, professor Richard Oriani of the University of Minnesota reported excess heat.

Groups that did report successes found that some of their cells were producing the effect, while other cells that were built exactly the same and used the same materials were not. Researchers who continued to work on the topic have claimed over the years that many successful replications had been made, but still had problems getting reliable replications. Reproducibility is one of the main principles of the scientific method, and its lack led most physicists to believe that the few positive reports could be attributed to experimental error. (Note: Reger, Goode & Ball 2009, pp. 814–815 "After several years and multiple experiments by numerous investigators, most of the scientific community now considers the original claims unsupported by the evidence. [from image caption] Virtually every experiment that tried to replicate their claims failed. Electrochemical cold fusion is widely considered to be discredited.") The DOE 2004 report said among its conclusions and recommendations:

Ordinarily, new scientific discoveries are claimed to be consistent and reproducible; as a result, if the experiments are not complicated, the discovery can usually be confirmed or disproved in a few months. The claims of cold fusion, however, are unusual in that even the strongest proponents of cold fusion assert that the experiments, for unknown reasons, are not consistent and reproducible at the present time. (...) Internal inconsistencies and lack of predictability and reproducibility remain serious concerns. (...) The Panel recommends that the cold fusion research efforts in the area of heat production focus primarily on confirming or disproving reports of excess heat.

==== Loading ratio ====
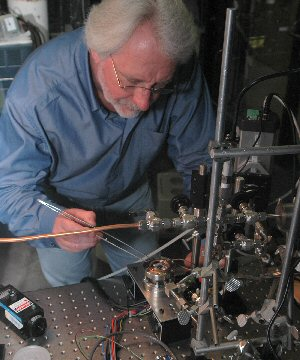
Michael McKubre working on deuterium gas-based cold fusion cell used by SRI International

Cold fusion researchers (McKubre since 1994, ENEA in 2011) have speculated that a cell that is loaded with a deuterium/palladium ratio lower than 100% (or 1:1) will not produce excess heat. Since most of the negative replications from 1989 to 1990 did not report their ratios, this has been proposed as an explanation for failed reproducibility. This loading ratio is hard to obtain, and some batches of palladium never reach it because the pressure causes cracks in the palladium, allowing the deuterium to escape. Fleischmann and Pons never disclosed the deuterium/palladium ratio achieved in their cells; as of 2002 there were no longer any batches of the palladium used by Fleischmann and Pons because the supplier changed the manufacturing process, and researchers still had problems finding batches of palladium that achieved heat production reliably.

==== Misinterpretation of data ====
Some research groups initially reported that they had replicated the Fleischmann and Pons results but later retracted their reports and offered an alternative explanation for their original positive results. A group at Georgia Tech found problems with their neutron detector, and Texas A&M discovered bad wiring in their thermometers. These retractions, combined with negative results from some famous laboratories, led most scientists to conclude, as early as 1989, that no positive result should be attributed to cold fusion.

==== Calorimetry errors ====
The calculation of excess heat in electrochemical cells involves certain assumptions. Errors in these assumptions have been offered as non-nuclear explanations for excess heat.

One assumption made by Fleischmann and Pons is that the efficiency of electrolysis is nearly 100%, meaning nearly all the electricity applied to the cell resulted in electrolysis of water, with negligible resistive heating and substantially all the electrolysis product leaving the cell unchanged. This assumption gives the amount of energy expended converting liquid D_{2}O into gaseous D_{2} and O_{2}. The efficiency of electrolysis is less than one if hydrogen and oxygen recombine to a significant extent within the calorimeter. Several researchers have described potential mechanisms by which this process could occur and thereby account for excess heat in electrolysis experiments.

Another assumption is that heat loss from the calorimeter maintains the same relationship with measured temperature as found when calibrating the calorimeter. This assumption ceases to be accurate if the temperature distribution within the cell becomes significantly altered from the condition under which calibration measurements were made. This can happen, for example, if fluid circulation within the cell becomes significantly altered. Recombination of hydrogen and oxygen within the calorimeter would also alter the heat distribution and invalidate the calibration.

== Publications ==
The ISI identified cold fusion as the scientific topic with the largest number of published papers in 1989, of all scientific disciplines. The Nobel Laureate Julian Schwinger declared himself a supporter of cold fusion in the fall of 1989, after much of the response to the initial reports had turned negative. He tried to publish his theoretical paper "Cold Fusion: A Hypothesis" in Physical Review Letters, but the peer reviewers rejected it so harshly that he felt deeply insulted, and he resigned from the American Physical Society (publisher of PRL) in protest.

The number of papers sharply declined after 1990 because of two simultaneous phenomena: first, scientists abandoned the field; second, journal editors declined to review new papers. Consequently, cold fusion fell off the ISI charts. Researchers who got negative results turned their backs on the field; those who continued to publish were simply ignored. A 1993 paper in Physics Letters A was the last paper published by Fleischmann, and "one of the last reports [by Fleischmann] to be formally challenged on technical grounds by a cold fusion skeptic." (Note: Labinger & Weininger 2005, p. 1919 Fleischmann's paper was challenged in Morrison, R.O. Douglas (28 February 1994). "Comments on claims of excess enthalpy by Fleischmann and Pons using simple cells made to boil". Phys. Lett. A. 185 (5–6): 498–502. Bibcode:1994PhLA..185..498M. doi:10.1016/0375-9601(94)91133-9.)

The Journal of Fusion Technology (FT) established a permanent feature in 1990 for cold fusion papers, publishing over a dozen papers per year and giving a mainstream outlet for cold fusion researchers. When editor-in-chief George H. Miley retired in 2001, the journal stopped accepting new cold fusion papers. This has been cited as an example of the importance of sympathetic influential individuals to the publication of cold fusion papers in certain journals.

The decline of publications in cold fusion has been described as a "failed information epidemic". (Note: Ackermann 2006 "(p. 11) Both the Polywater and Cold Nuclear Fusion journal literatures exhibit episodes of epidemic growth and decline.") The sudden surge of supporters until roughly 50% of scientists support the theory, followed by a decline until there is only a very small number of supporters, has been described as a characteristic of pathological science. (Note: Close 1992, pp. 254–255, 329 "[paraphrasing Morrison] The usual cycle in such cases, he notes, is that interest suddenly erupts (...) The phenomenon then separates the scientists in two camps, believers and skeptics. Interest dies as only a small band of believers is able to 'produce the phenomenon' (...) even in the face of overwhelming evidence to the contrary, the original practitioners may continue to believe in it for the rest of the careers.", Ball 2001, p. 308, Simon 2002, pp. 104, Bettencourt, Kaiser & Kaur 2009) (Note: Sixth criterion of Langmuir: "During the course of the controversy the ratio of supporters to critics rises to near 50% and then falls gradually to oblivion. Langmuir & Hall 1989, pp. 43–44", quoted in Simon 2002, p. 104, paraphrased in Ball 2001, p. 308. It has also been applied to the number of published results, in Huizenga 1993, pp. xi, 207–209 "The ratio of the worldwide positive results on cold fusion to negative results peaked at approximately 50% (...) qualitatively in agreement with Langmuir's sixth criteria.") The lack of a shared set of unifying concepts and techniques has prevented the creation of a dense network of collaboration in the field; researchers perform efforts in their own and in disparate directions, making the transition to "normal" science more difficult.

Cold fusion reports continued to be published in a few journals like Journal of Electroanalytical Chemistry and Il Nuovo Cimento. Some papers also appeared in Journal of Physical Chemistry, Physics Letters A, International Journal of Hydrogen Energy, and a number of Japanese and Russian journals of physics, chemistry, and engineering. Since 2005, Naturwissenschaften has published cold fusion papers; in 2009, the journal named a cold fusion researcher to its editorial board. In 2015 the Indian multidisciplinary journal Current Science published a special section devoted entirely to cold fusion related papers.

In the 1990s, the groups that continued to research cold fusion and their supporters established (non-peer-reviewed) periodicals such as Fusion Facts, Cold Fusion Magazine, Infinite Energy Magazine and New Energy Times to cover developments in cold fusion and other fringe claims in energy production that were ignored in other venues. The internet has also become a major means of communication and self-publication for CF researchers.

== Conferences ==
Cold fusion researchers were for many years unable to get papers accepted at scientific meetings, prompting the creation of their own conferences. The International Conference on Cold Fusion (ICCF) was first held in 1990 and has met every 12 to 18 months since. Attendees at some of the early conferences were described as offering no criticism to papers and presentations for fear of giving ammunition to external critics, thus allowing the proliferation of crackpots and hampering the conduct of serious science. (Note: The first three conferences are commented in detail in Huizenga 1993, pp. 237–247, 274–285, specially 240, 275–277) Critics and skeptics stopped attending these conferences, with the notable exception of Douglas Morrison, who died in 2001. With the founding in 2004 of the International Society for Condensed Matter Nuclear Science (ISCMNS), the conference was renamed the International Conference on Condensed Matter Nuclear Science—for reasons that are detailed in the subsequent research section above—but reverted to the old name in 2008. Cold fusion research is often referenced by proponents as "low-energy nuclear reactions", or LENR, but according to sociologist Bart Simon the "cold fusion" label continues to serve a social function in creating a collective identity for the field.

Since 2006, the American Physical Society (APS) has included cold fusion sessions at their semiannual meetings, clarifying that this does not imply a softening of skepticism. Since 2007, the American Chemical Society (ACS) meetings also include "invited symposium(s)" on cold fusion. An ACS program chair, Gopal Coimbatore, said that without a proper forum the matter would never be discussed and, "with the world facing an energy crisis, it is worth exploring all possibilities."

On 22–25 March 2009, the American Chemical Society meeting included a four-day symposium in conjunction with the 20th anniversary of the announcement of cold fusion. Researchers working at the U.S. Navy's Space and Naval Warfare Systems Center (SPAWAR) reported detection of energetic neutrons using a heavy water electrolysis setup and a CR-39 detector, a result previously published in Naturwissenschaften. The authors claim that these neutrons are indicative of nuclear reactions. Without quantitative analysis of the number, energy, and timing of the neutrons and exclusion of other potential sources, this interpretation is unlikely to find acceptance by the wider scientific community.

== Patents ==
Although details have not surfaced, it appears that the University of Utah forced the 23 March 1989 Fleischmann and Pons announcement to establish priority over the discovery and its patents before the joint publication with Jones. The Massachusetts Institute of Technology (MIT) announced on 12 April 1989 that it had applied for its own patents based on theoretical work of one of its researchers, Peter L. Hagelstein, who had been sending papers to journals from 5 to 12 April. An MIT graduate student applied for a patent but was reportedly rejected by the USPTO in part by the citation of the "negative" MIT Plasma Fusion Center's cold fusion experiment of 1989. On 2 December 1993 the University of Utah licensed all its cold fusion patents to ENECO, a new company created to profit from cold fusion discoveries, and in March 1998 it said that it would no longer defend its patents.

The U.S. Patent and Trademark Office (USPTO) now rejects patents claiming cold fusion. Esther Kepplinger, the deputy commissioner of patents in 2004, said that this was done using the same argument as with perpetual motion machines: that they do not work. Patent applications are required to show that the invention is "useful", and this utility is dependent on the invention's ability to function. In general USPTO rejections on the sole grounds of the invention's being "inoperative" are rare, since such rejections need to demonstrate "proof of total incapacity", and cases where those rejections are upheld in a Federal Court are even rarer: nevertheless, in 2000, a rejection of a cold fusion patent was appealed in a Federal Court and it was upheld, in part on the grounds that the inventor was unable to establish the utility of the invention. (Note: Swartz, 232 F.3d 862, 56 USPQ2d 1703, (Fed. Cir. 2000). decision Archived 12 March 2008 at the Wayback Machine. Sources: "2164.07 Relationship of Enablement Requirement to Utility Requirement of 35 U.S.C. 101 – 2100 Patentability. B. Burden on the Examiner. Examiner Has Initial Burden To Show That One of Ordinary Skill in the Art Would Reasonably Doubt the Asserted Utility", U.S. Patent and Trademark Office, archived from the original on 12 September 2012 Manual of Patent Examining Procedure, in reference to 35 U.S.C. § 101; Alan L. Durham (2004), Patent law essentials: a concise guide (2nd, illustrated ed.), Greenwood Publishing Group, p. 72 (footnote 30), ISBN 978-0-275-98205-8; Jeffrey G. Sheldon (1992), How to write a patent application (illustrated ed.), Practising Law Institute, ISBN 978-0-87224-044-5)

A U.S. patent might still be granted when given a different name to disassociate it from cold fusion, though this strategy has had little success in the US: the same claims that need to be patented can identify it with cold fusion, and most of these patents cannot avoid mentioning Fleischmann and Pons' research due to legal constraints, thus alerting the patent reviewer that it is a cold-fusion-related patent. David Voss said in 1999 that some patents that closely resemble cold fusion processes, and that use materials used in cold fusion, have been granted by the USPTO. The inventor of three such patents had his applications initially rejected when they were reviewed by experts in nuclear science; but then he rewrote the patents to focus more on the electrochemical parts so they would be reviewed instead by experts in electrochemistry, who approved them. When asked about the resemblance to cold fusion, the patent holder said that it used nuclear processes involving "new nuclear physics" unrelated to cold fusion. Melvin Miles was granted in 2004 a patent for a cold fusion device, and in 2007 he described his efforts to remove all instances of "cold fusion" from the patent description to avoid having it rejected outright.

At least one patent related to cold fusion has been granted by the European Patent Office.

A patent only legally prevents others from using or benefiting from one's invention. However, the general public perceives a patent as a stamp of approval, and a holder of three cold fusion patents said the patents were very valuable and had helped in getting investments.

== Cultural references ==
A 1990 Michael Winner film Bullseye!, starring Michael Caine and Roger Moore, referenced the Fleischmann and Pons experiment. The film – a comedy – concerned conmen trying to steal scientists' purported findings. However, the film had a poor reception, being described as "appallingly unfunny".

In Undead Science, sociologist Bart Simon gives some examples of cold fusion in popular culture, saying that some scientists use cold fusion as a synonym for outrageous claims made with no supporting proof, and courses of ethics in science give it as an example of pathological science. It has appeared as a joke in Murphy Brown and The Simpsons. It was adopted as a software product name Adobe ColdFusion and a brand of protein bars (Cold Fusion Foods). It has also appeared in advertising as a synonym for impossible science, for example a 1995 advertisement for Pepsi Max.

The plot of Chain Reaction, a 1996 action-adventure film, shows a theoretical variation of the cold fusion principle.

The plot of The Saint, a 1997 action-adventure film, parallels the story of Fleischmann and Pons, although with a different ending. In Undead Science, Simon posits that film might have affected the public perception of cold fusion, pushing it further into the science fiction realm.

In an episode of the Sci-fi television series Outer Limits that aired on June 26, 1998 an ex-student returns to his university with bombs he made by cracking the secret of cold fusion, after being expelled from the school's physics program. He swears he won't follow through if authorities execute the 5 people he hates the most. Most physicists believe cold fusion is impossible, so to prove it he detonates a smaller bomb on campus by remote control.

Similarly, the tenth episode of 2000 science fiction TV drama Life Force ("Paradise Island") is also based around cold fusion, specifically the efforts of eccentric scientist Hepzibah McKinley (Amanda Walker), who is convinced she has perfected it based on her father's incomplete research into the subject. The episode explores its potential benefits and viability within the ongoing post-apocalyptic global warming scenario of the series.

In the 2023 video game Atomic Heart, cold fusion is responsible for nearly all of the technological advances. The video game and television series Fallout also features cold fusion as a major source of energy.

== See also ==
- Bubble fusion
- Cold fission
- Energy Catalyzer (E-cat)
- Faraday-efficiency effect
- Incredible utility (patent concept)
- Lattice confinement fusion
- Muon-catalyzed fusion
- Nuclear transmutation
- Patterson power cell
- Pyroelectric fusion
- Widom–Larsen theory

== Bibliography ==
- Ackermann, Eric (February 2006), "Indicators of failed information epidemics in the scientific journal literature: A publication analysis of Polywater and Cold Nuclear Fusion", Scientometrics, 66 (3): 451–466, doi:10.1007/s11192-006-0033-0, S2CID 29197941
- Adam, David (24 March 2005), Rusbringer, Alan (ed.), "In from the cold", The Guardian, London
- Alfred, Randy (23 March 2009), "March 23, 1989: Cold Fusion Gets Cold Shoulder", Wired
- Ball, Phillip (2001), Life's matrix: a biography of water (illustrated, reprinted ed.), University of California Press, ISBN 978-0-520-23008-8
- Barras, Collin (23 March 2009), "Neutron tracks revive hopes for cold fusion", New Scientist
- Beaudette, Charles G. (2002), Excess Heat & Why Cold Fusion Research Prevailed, South Bristol, Maine: Oak Grove Press, ISBN 978-0-9678548-3-0
- Berger, Eric (23 March 2009), "Navy scientist announces possible cold fusion reactions", Houston Chronicle
- Bettencourt, Luís M.A.; Kaiser, David I.; Kaur, Jasleen (July 2009), "Scientific discovery and topological transitions in collaboration networks" (PDF), Journal of Informetrics, 3 (3): 210–221, doi:10.1016/j.joi.2009.03.001, hdl:1721.1/50230, S2CID 1914074, MIT Open Access Articles.
- Biberian, Jean-Paul (2007), "Condensed Matter Nuclear Science (Cold Fusion): An Update" (PDF), International Journal of Nuclear Energy Science and Technology, 3 (1) 12439: 31–42, Bibcode:2007IJNES...3...31B, doi:10.1504/IJNEST.2007.012439, archived (PDF) from the original on 30 May 2008
- Bird, Alexander (1998), Routledge (ed.), Philosophy of Science: Alexander Bird (illustrated, reprint ed.), London: UCL Press, ISBN 978-1-85728-504-8
- Bowen, Jerry (10 April 1989), "Science: Nuclear Fusion", CBS Evening News
- Browne, M. (3 May 1989), "Physicists Debunk Claim Of a New Kind of Fusion", The New York Times
- Brumfiel, Geoff (2 December 2004), "US review rekindles cold fusion debate. Energy panel split over whether experiments produced power", Nature News, doi:10.1038/news041129-11
- Choi, Charles (2005), "Back to Square One", Scientific American
- Chubb, Scott; McKubre, Michael C. H.; Krivit, Steve B.; Chubb, Talbot; Miley, George H.; Swartz, Mitchell; Violante, V.; Stringham, Roger; Fleischmann, Martin; Li, Zing Z.; Biberian, J.P.; Collis, William (2006), Session W41: Cold Fusion, American Physical Society
- Close, Frank E. (1992), Too Hot to Handle: The Race for Cold Fusion (2 ed.), London: Penguin, ISBN 978-0-14-015926-4
- Collins, Harry; Pinch, Trevor (1993), The Golem: What Everyone Should Know About Science (1st ed.), Cambridge University Press, ISBN 0-521-47736-0
- Crease, Robert; Samios, N.P. (1989), "Cold Fusion confusion", The New York Times Magazine, no. 24 September 1989, pp. 34–38
- Daley, Beth (27 July 2004), "Heating up a cold theory. MIT professor risks career to reenergize discredited idea", The Boston Globe, archived from the original on 4 August 2004
- Derry, Gregory Neil (2002), What Science Is and How It Works (reprint, illustrated ed.), Princeton, New Jersey; Oxford: Princeton University Press, ISBN 978-0-691-09550-9, OCLC 40693869
- Feder, Toni (2004), "DOE Warms to Cold Fusion", Physics Today, 57 (4): 27–28, Bibcode:2004PhT....57d..27F, doi:10.1063/1.1752414
- Feder, Toni (January 2005), "Cold Fusion Gets Chilly Encore", Physics Today, 58 (1): 31, Bibcode:2005PhT....58a..31F, doi:10.1063/1.1881896
- Fleischmann, Martin; Pons, Stanley (1989), "Electrochemically induced nuclear fusion of deuterium", Journal of Electroanalytical Chemistry, 261 (2A): 301–308, doi:10.1016/0022-0728(89)80006-3
- Fleischmann, Martin; Pons, Stanley; Anderson, Mark W.; Li, Lian Jun; Hawkins, Marvin (1990), "Calorimetry of the palladium-deuterium-heavy water system", Journal of Electroanalytical Chemistry, 287 (2): 293–348, doi:10.1016/0022-0728(90)80009-U
- Fleischmann, Martin; Pons, S. (1993), "Calorimetry of the Pd-D2O system: from simplicity via complications to simplicity", Physics Letters A, 176 (1–2): 118–129, Bibcode:1993PhLA..176..118F, doi:10.1016/0375-9601(93)90327-V
- Fox, Barry (25 June 1994), "Patents: Cold fusion rides again", New Scientist (1931), ISSN 0262-4079
- Gai, M.; Rugari, S.L.; France, R.H.; Lund, B.J.; Zhao, Z.; Davenport, A.J.; Isaacs, H.S.; Lynn, K.G. (1989), "Upper limits on neutron and big gamma-ray emission from cold fusion", Nature, 340 (6228): 29–34, Bibcode:1989Natur.340...29G, doi:10.1038/340029a0, S2CID 4331780
- Goodstein, David (1994), "Whatever happened to cold fusion?", American Scholar, 63 (4): 527–541, ISSN 0003-0937, archived from the original on 16 May 2008
- Goodstein, David L. (2010), On Fact and Fraud:Cautionary Tales from the Front Lines of Science, Princeton: Princeton University Press, ISBN 978-0-691-13966-1
- Hagelstein, Peter L.; McKubre, Michael; Nagel, David; Chubb, Talbot; Hekman, Randall (2004), "New Physical Effects in Metal Deuterides" (PDF), Condensed Matter Nuclear Science. Proceedings of the 11th International Conference on Cold Fusion. Held 31 October–5 November 2004 in Marseilles, vol. 11, p. 23, Bibcode:2006cmns...11...23H, doi:10.1142/9789812774354_0003, ISBN 978-981-256-640-9, archived from the original (PDF) on 6 January 2007, (manuscript).
- Hagelstein, Peter L. (2010), "Constraints on energetic particles in the Fleischmann–Pons experiment", Naturwissenschaften, 97 (4): 345–352, Bibcode:2010NW.....97..345H, doi:10.1007/s00114-009-0644-4, hdl:1721.1/71631, PMID 20143040, S2CID 9496513
- Hoffman, Nate (1995), A Dialogue on Chemically Induced Nuclear Effects: A Guide for the Perplexed About Cold Fusion, La Grange Park, Illinois: American Nuclear Society, ISBN 978-0-89448-558-9
- Huizenga, John R. (1993), Cold Fusion: The Scientific Fiasco of the Century (2 ed.), Oxford and New York: Oxford University Press, ISBN 978-0-19-855817-0
- Jayaraman, K.S. (17 January 2008), "Cold fusion hot again", Nature India, doi:10.1038/nindia.2008.77
- Jones, J.E.; Hansen, L.D.; Jones, S.E.; Shelton, D.S.; Thorne, J.M. (1995), "Faradaic efficiencies less than 100% during electrolysis of water can account for reports of excess heat in 'cold fusion' cells", Journal of Physical Chemistry, 99 (18): 6973–6979, doi:10.1021/j100018a033
- Joyce, Christopher (16 June 1990), "Gunfight at the cold fusion corral", New Scientist (1721): 22, ISSN 0262-4079
- Kean, Sam (26 July 2010), "Palladium: The Cold Fusion Fanatics Can't Get Enough of the Stuff", Slate
- Kitamura, Akira; Nohmi, Takayoshi; Sasaki, Yu; Taniike, Akira; Takahashi, Akito; Seto, Reiko; Fujita, Yushi (2009), "Anomalous Effects in Charging of Pd Powders with High Density Hydrogen Isotopes", Physics Letters A, 373 (35): 3109–3112, Bibcode:2009PhLA..373.3109K, doi:10.1016/j.physleta.2009.06.061, hdl:20.500.14094/90001369
- Kowalski, Ludwik (2004), "Jones's manuscript on History of Cold Fusion at BYU", Upper Montclair, New Jersey: csam.montclair.edu, archived from the original on 6 May 2008
- Kozima, Hideo (2006), The Science of the Cold Fusion phenomenon, New York: Elsevier Science, ISBN 978-0-08-045110-7
- Kruglinski, Susan (3 March 2006), "Whatever Happened To... Cold Fusion?", Discover Magazine, ISSN 0274-7529
- Labinger, JA; Weininger, SJ (2005), "Controversy in chemistry: how do you prove a negative? – the cases of phlogiston and cold fusion", Angew Chem Int Ed Engl, 44 (13): 1916–1922, Bibcode:2005ACIE...44.1916L, doi:10.1002/anie.200462084, PMID 15770617, "So there matters stand: no cold fusion researcher has been able to dispel the stigma of 'pathological science' by rigorously and reproducibly demonstrating effects sufficiently large to exclude the possibility of error (for example, by constructing a working power generator), nor does it seem possible to conclude unequivocally that all the apparently anomalous behavior can be attributed to error."
- Laurence, William L. (30 December 1956), "Cold Fusion of Hydrogen Atoms; A Fourth Method Pulling Together", The New York Times, p. E7
- Langmuir, Irving; Hall, Robert N. (1989). "Pathological science". Physics Today. 42 (10): 36–48. Bibcode:1989PhT....42j..36L. doi:10.1063/1.881205.
- Lewenstein, Bruce V. (1994), "Cornell cold fusion archive" (PDF), Collection n°4451, Division of Rare and Manuscript Collections, Cornell University Library, archived from the original (PDF) on 30 May 2008
- Lewis, N.S.; Barnes, C.A.; Heben, M.J.; Kumar, A.; Lunt, S.R.; McManis, G.E.; Miskelly, S.R.; Penner, G.M.; et al. (1989), "Searches for low-temperature nuclear fusion of deuterium in palladium", Nature, 340 (6234): 525–530, Bibcode:1989Natur.340..525L, doi:10.1038/340525a0, S2CID 4359244
- Mallove, Eugene (1991), Fire from Ice: Searching for the Truth Behind the Cold Fusion Furor, London: Wiley, ISBN 978-0-471-53139-5
- Martellucci, Sergio; Rosati, Angela; Scaramuzzi, Francesco; Violante, Vittorio, eds. (2009). Cold Fusion: The history of research in Italy (PDF). Translated by Costigliola, Chiara Maria. Archived (PDF) from the original on 13 March 2016. In the foreword by the president of ENEA the belief is expressed that the cold fusion phenomenon is proved.
- Mehra, Jagdish; Milton, K. A.; Schwinger, Julian Seymour (2000), Climbing the Mountain: The Scientific Biography of Julian Schwinger (illustrated ed.), New York: Oxford University Press, ISBN 978-0-19-850658-4
- Mengoli, G.; Bernardini, M.; Manduchi, C.; Zannoni, G. (1998), "Calorimetry close to the boiling temperature of the D_{2}O/Pd electrolytic system", Journal of Electroanalytical Chemistry, 444 (2): 155–167, doi:10.1016/S0022-0728(97)00634-7
- Morrison, Douglas R.O. "Assessment". In Saeta (1999), pp. 3–5.
- Mosier-Boss, Pamela A.; Szpak, Stanislaw; Gordon, Frank E.; Forsley, L.P.G. (2009), "Triple tracks in CR-39 as the result of Pd–D Co-deposition: evidence of energetic neutrons", Naturwissenschaften, 96 (1): 135–142, Bibcode:2009NW.....96..135M, doi:10.1007/s00114-008-0449-x, PMID 18828003, S2CID 11044813
- Mullins, Justin (September 2004), "Cold Fusion Back From the Dead", IEEE Spectrum, 41 (9): 22, doi:10.1109/MSPEC.2004.1330805, S2CID 7170843
- Oriani, Richard A.; Nelson, John C.; Lee, Sung-Kyu; Broadhurst, J. H. (1990), "Calorimetric Measurements of Excess Power Output During the Cathodic Charging of Deuterium into Palladium", Fusion Technology, 18 (4): 652–662, Bibcode:1990FuTec..18..652O, doi:10.13182/FST90-A29259, ISSN 0748-1896, S2CID 118860562
- Paneth, Fritz; Peters, Kurt (1926), "Über die Verwandlung von Wasserstoff in Helium", Naturwissenschaften (in German), 14 (43): 956–962, Bibcode:1926NW.....14..956P, doi:10.1007/BF01579126, S2CID 43265081
- Park, Robert L (2000), Voodoo Science: The road from foolishness to fraud, Oxford, U.K. & New York: Oxford University Press, ISBN 978-0-19-860443-3
- Petit, Charles (14 March 2009), "Cold panacea: two researchers proclaimed 20 years ago that they'd achieved cold fusion, the ultimate energy solution. The workwent nowhere, but the hope remains", Science News, 175 (6): 20–24, doi:10.1002/scin.2009.5591750622
- Platt, Charles (1998), "What if Cold Fusion is Real?", Wired Magazine, 6 (11)
- Pollack, A. (17 November 1992), "Cold Fusion, Derided in U.S., Is Hot In Japan", The New York Times
- Pollack, A. (26 August 1997), "Japan, Long a Holdout, is Ending its Quest for Cold Fusion", The New York Times, vol. 79, pp. 243, C4
- Pool, Robert (28 April 1989), "How cold fusion happened – twice!", Science, 244 (4903): 420–423, Bibcode:1989Sci...244..420P, doi:10.1126/science.244.4903.420, PMID 17807604, archived from the original on 2 June 2013 – via HighBeam Research
- Radio Times Film Unit (2013). Radio Times Guide to Films 2014. Immediate Media Company. ISBN 978-0-9567523-6-9.
- Reger, Daniel L.; Goode, Scott R.; Ball, David W. (2009), Chemistry: Principles and Practice (3rd revised ed.), Cengage Learning, pp. 814–815, ISBN 978-0-534-42012-3
- Rousseau, D. L. (January–February 1992), "Case Studies in Pathological Science: How the Loss of Objectivity Led to False Conclusions in Studies of Polywater, Infinite Dilution and Cold Fusion", American Scientist, 80 (1): 54–63, Bibcode:1992AmSci..80...54R
- Saeta, Peter N., ed. (21 October 1999), "What is the current scientific thinking on cold fusion? Is there any possible validity to this phenomenon?", Scientific American, Ask the Experts, pp. 1–6
- Sampson, Mark T. (2009), "'Cold fusion' rebirth? New evidence for existence of controversial energy source", ACS, archived from the original on 2 October 2011
- Sanderson, Katharine (29 March 2007), "Cold fusion is back at the American Chemical Society", Nature News, ISSN 0028-0836, archived from the original on 27 August 2009
- Scanlon, Eileen; Hill, Roger (1999). Communicating science: contexts and channels. London: Routledge. ISBN 0-415-19752-X. OCLC 39180844.
- Scaramuzzi, F. (2000), "Ten years of cold fusion: an eye-witness account", Accountability in Research, 8 (1&2): 77–101, doi:10.1080/08989620008573967, ISSN 0898-9621, OCLC 17959730, S2CID 6158268
- Schaffer, Michael J. "Historical overview, assessment". In Saeta (1999), pp. 1–3.
- Seife, Charles (2008), Sun in a Bottle: The Strange History of Fusion and the Science of Wishful Thinking, New York: Viking, ISBN 978-0-670-02033-1
- Shamoo, Adil E.; Resnik, David B. (2003), Oxford University Press US (ed.), Responsible Conduct of Research (2nd illustrated ed.), Oxford: Oxford University Press, ISBN 978-0-19-514846-6
- Shanahan, Kirk L. (23 May 2002), "A systematic error in mass flow calorimetry demonstrated", Thermochimica Acta, 382 (2): 95–100, Bibcode:2002TcAc..387...95S, doi:10.1016/S0040-6031(01)00832-2
- Shanahan, Kirk L. (April 2005), "Comments on "Thermal behavior of polarized Pd/D electrodes prepared by co-deposition"" (PDF), Thermochimica Acta, 428 (1–2): 207–212, Bibcode:2005TcAc..428..207S, doi:10.1016/j.tca.2004.11.007
- Shanahan, Kirk L. (February 2006), "Reply to 'Comment on papers by K. Shanahan that propose to explain anomalous heat generated by cold fusion', E. Storms", Short communication, Thermochimica Acta, 441 (2): 210–214, doi:10.1016/j.tca.2005.11.029
- Shkedi, Zvi; McDonald, Robert C.; Breen, John J.; Maguire, Stephen J.; Veranth, Joe (1995), "Calorimetry, Excess Heat, and Faraday Efficiency in Ni-H_{2}O Electrolytic Cells", Fusion Technology, 28 (4): 1720–1731, Bibcode:1995FuTec..28.1720S, doi:10.13182/FST95-A30436, ISSN 0748-1896
- Simon, Bart (2002), Undead Science: Science studies and the afterlife of cold fusion (illustrated ed.), Rutgers University Press, p. 49, Bibcode:2002usss.book.....S, ISBN 978-0-8135-3154-0
- Szpak, Stanislaw; Mosier-Boss, Pamela A.; Miles, Melvin H.; Fleischmann, Martin (2004), "Thermal behavior of polarized Pd/D electrodes prepared by co-deposition", Thermochimica Acta, 410 (1–2): 101–107, Bibcode:2004TcAc..410..101S, doi:10.1016/S0040-6031(03)00401-5
- Tate, N. (1989), "MIT bombshell knocks fusion 'breakthrough' cold", Boston Herald, no. 1 May 1989, p. 1, ISSN 0738-5854
- Taubes, Gary (15 June 1990), "Cold fusion conundrum at Texas A&M", Science, 248 (4961): 1299–1304, Bibcode:1990Sci...248.1299T, doi:10.1126/science.248.4961.1299, PMID 17747511, S2CID 9602261
- Taubes, Gary (1993), Bad Science: The Short Life and Weird Times of Cold Fusion, New York: Random House, ISBN 978-0-394-58456-0
- US DOE, U.S. Department of Energy (1989), A Report of the Energy Research Advisory Board to the United States Department of Energy (Report), Washington, DC: U.S. Department of Energy
- US DOE, U.S. Department of Energy (2004), Report of the Review of Low Energy Nuclear Reactions (PDF) (Report), Washington, DC: U.S. Department of Energy, archived from the original (PDF) on 26 February 2008
- Van Noorden, R. (April 2007), "Cold fusion back on the menu", Chemistry World, ISSN 1473-7604
- Rogers, Vern C.; Sandquist, Gary M. (December 1990), "Cold fusion reaction products and their measurement", Journal of Fusion Energy, 9 (4): 483–485, Bibcode:1990JFuE....9..483R, doi:10.1007/BF01588284, S2CID 120196723
- Voss, David (1 March 1999a), "What Ever Happened to Cold Fusion", Physics World, 12 (3): 12–14, doi:10.1088/2058-7058/12/3/14, ISSN 0953-8585, archived from the original on 1 July 2008
- Voss, David (21 May 1999b), "'New Physics' Finds a Haven at the Patent Office", Science, 284 (5418): 1252–1254, doi:10.1126/science.284.5418.1252, ISSN 0036-8075, S2CID 108860158
- Wilford, John Noble (24 April 1989), "Fusion Furor: Science's Human Face", The New York Times, ISSN 0362-4331, archived from the original on 25 June 2017
- Williams D, Findlay D, Craston D, Sené M, et al. (1989), "Upper bounds on 'cold fusion' in electrolytic cells", Nature, 342 (6248): 375–384, Bibcode:1989Natur.342..375W, doi:10.1038/342375a0, S2CID 4347251
- Wilner, Bertil (May 1989), "No new fusion under the Sun", Nature, 339 (6221): 180, Bibcode:1989Natur.339..180W, doi:10.1038/339180a0, S2CID 26487447
- Wilson, R.H.; Bray, J.W.; Kosky, P.G.; Vakil, H.B.; Will, F.G. (1992), "Analysis of experiments on the calorimetry of LiOD-D_{2}O electrochemical cells", Journal of Electroanalytical Chemistry, 332 (1–2): 1–31, doi:10.1016/0022-0728(92)80338-5
