= Infinite Energy (magazine) =

American energy magazine

Infinite Energy: The Magazine of New Energy Technology, more commonly referred to simply as Infinite Energy, is a bi-monthly magazine published in New Hampshire that details theories and experiments concerning alternative energy, new science and new physics. The phrase "new energy" in the subtitle is a euphemism for perpetual motion. The magazine was founded by Eugene Mallove, who was its editor-in-chief, and is owned by the non-profit New Energy Foundation. It was established in 1994 as Cold Fusion magazine and changed its name in March 1995. As of 2026 it appears to have ceased publication.

Topics of interest include "new hydrogen physics," also called cold fusion; vacuum energy, or zero point energy; and so-called "environmental energy" which they define as the attempt to violate the Second Law of Thermodynamics, for example with a perpetual motion machine. This is done in pursuit of the founder's commitment to "unearthing new sources of energy and new paradigms in science." The magazine has also published articles and book reviews that are critical of the Big Bang theory that describes the origin of the universe.

The magazine had a print run of 3,000, and is available on U.S. newsstands. The issues ranged in size from 48 to 100 pages.

== History ==
Infinite Energy was founded by Dr. Eugene Mallove, a former chief science writer at the Massachusetts Institute of Technology (MIT), in response to what he and other proponents viewed as the premature dismissal of cold fusion by the mainstream scientific community. The magazine emerged in the aftermath of the 1989 cold fusion controversy, when chemists Martin Fleischmann and Stanley Pons announced they had achieved nuclear fusion at room temperature—an extraordinary claim that drew global attention but was ultimately rejected by most physicists due to irreproducible results and methodological flaws.

Mallove, disillusioned by what he perceived as scientific misconduct and suppression of promising research, resigned from MIT and became one of the most vocal defenders of cold fusion, or what became known in later years as low-energy nuclear reactions (LENR). He launched Infinite Energy to serve as a platform for the continued exploration of LENR, alternative energy technologies, and unconventional scientific ideas that struggled to find a place in mainstream journals.

Backed by the non-profit New Energy Foundation, the magazine was published from Concord, New Hampshire, and quickly became a hub for the cold fusion community, featuring articles, experimental reports, interviews, and editorials advocating for open inquiry and challenging the boundaries of accepted science. Over the years, Infinite Energy also covered topics such as zero-point energy, over-unity devices, and breakthrough propulsion concepts, appealing to a niche readership interested in revolutionary, albeit controversial, scientific developments. The magazine reflects the appeal of cold fusion and the broader tension between scientific orthodoxy and fringe innovation.

In the 2000s, the editorship was taken over by György Egely; more recently Bill Zebuhr was writing Editorials. Issue 167 (March - June 2024) is the last extant magazine published. As of 2026 it appears to have shut down,

== Reception ==
Charles Platt, writing for Wired in 1998, described the magazine as "a wild grab bag of eye-popping assertions and evangelistic rants against the establishment", though conceding that "at the same time, buried among the far-fetched claims were rigorous reports from credentialed scientists".
