= Robert Duncan (physicist) =

American physicist

Robert V. Duncan is an American physicist at Texas Tech University, Texas and previously served as vice chancellor for research at the University of Missouri in Columbia, Missouri. Prior to his current posting he held various assignments while serving as a professor of physics at UNM, including associate dean for research in the college of arts and sciences there, professor of physics and astronomy at the University of New Mexico, was named as the Gordon and Betty Moore Distinguished Scholar in the division of physics, mathematics and astronomy at the California Institute of Technology (Caltech), and is a fellow (and life member) of the American Physical Society "for pioneering advances in experimental studies of dynamic critical phenomena near the superfluid transition in 4He, and for the development of novel instrumentation and measurement techniques for use on earth and in space".

In October 2013, Duncan was named vice president for research at Texas Tech University by President M. Duane Nellis. He assumed his new role on January 1, 2014.

Duncan was asked by CBS News Sixty Minutes to investigate cold fusion on their behalf, and his findings were reported on the program in April, 2009. In this program he said that he had abandoned his doubts and was now convinced of the possibilities of cold fusion. He also gave a speech at The Missouri Energy Summit about his findings and on the scientific method.
