= Tadahiko Mizuno =

Japanese nuclear-chemist (born 1945)

- Tadahiko Mizuno in 2008
- Born: 1945; Asahikawa, Hokkaido, Japan
- Citizenship: Japan
- Known for: Cold fusion, nuclear transmutation
- Awards: The International Society for Condensed Matter Nuclear Science Prizes (Giuliano Preparata medal) in 2004
- Scientific career
- Fields: Nuclear fusion

Tadahiko Mizuno (水野 忠彦, Mizuno Tadahiko; born 1945) is a Japanese nuclear-chemist known for his work on cold fusion. He was a former assistant professor teaching the Atomic Power Environmental Materials program at Hokkaido University. He was also a member of Energy Environmental Institute of Engineering at Hokkaido University until 2009.

== Early life ==
Mizuno graduated from the Department of Applied Physics, Hokkaido University, Faculty of Engineering in March 1968. In March 1970, he graduated with a master's degree from the Department of Applied Physics, Hokkaido University, Faculty of Engineering. In April 1972 he completed his doctorate degree in Engineering at Hokkaido University, Faculty of Engineering, Department of Engineering. In March 1976, he received his doctorate in Engineering for "Study on formation process of hydride on the surface of Ti by d, n reaction” Teaching; Atomic Engineering, Corrosion, X-rays analysis, Electron microscope, Exercise: Mathematics, Physical Engineering.

== Awards ==
He was awarded The International Society for Condensed Matter Nuclear Science Prizes (Giuliano Preparata medal) in 2004 from The International Society for Condensed Matter Nuclear Science (ISCMNS). The ISCMNS is the organizer of a conference and a workshop on cold fusion and related topics.

== Publications ==
- "Sorption of Hydrogen On and In Hydrogen Absorbing Metal in Electrochemical Environments" (Plenum Press)
- "An understanding of the environment, Global environment and the human life” (Sankyo Publishing, in 2006)
- "Low Energy Nuclear Reactions Sourcebook" (American Chemical Society, in 2008)
- "Nuclear Transmutation: The Reality of Cold Fusion" (Infinite Energy Press, in 1998)

== Academic societies ==
- The International Society for Condensed Matter Nuclear Science
- International Hydrogen Energy Society
- International Institute of Aeronautics and Astronautics
- Atomic Energy Society of Japan
- Japan Society of Applied Physics
- Japan Cold Fusion Research Society

== Research activities ==
Electrochemical, metallurgy, nuclear reaction in condensed matter, elucidation of the peculiar behavior of hydrogen in the metal, hydrogen penetration in metals, hydrogen embrittlement, hydrogen production, hydrogen separation and purification, power conversion of hydrogen, elucidation of hydrogen behavior, development of unique methods using hydrogen isotopes, studying the behavior of hydrogen on metal. Mizuno has also written Numerous books representing the interaction between hydrogen and the metals.

== Extramural activities ==
Mizuno was involved in anti-terrorism measures as part of international safety measures for Hakodate Customs of Ministry of Finance.

== See also ==
- International Conference on Condensed Matter Nuclear Science
