= Richard Oriani =

American chemical engineer (1920–2015)

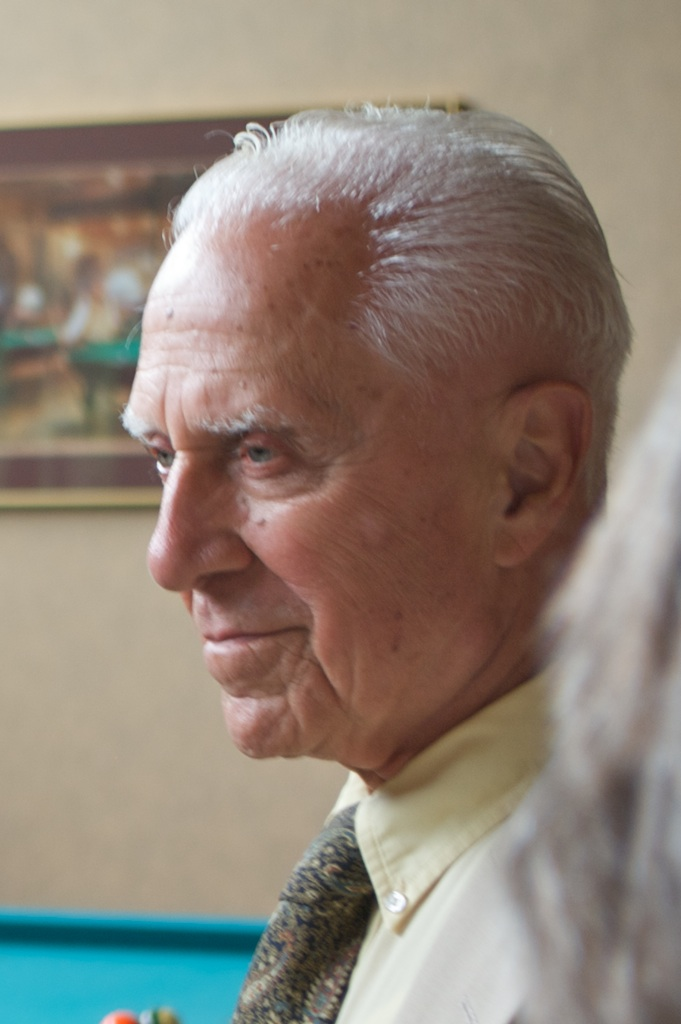
- Richard Oriani
- Born: July 19, 1920; San Salvador, El Salvador
- Died: August 11, 2015 (aged 95); Edina, Minnesota, U.S.
- Education: College of the City of New York (B.S); Princeton University (Ph.D)
- Spouse: Constance Oriani
- Children: 4
- Awards: Alexander von Humboldt Award (1984); W.R. Whitney Award of the National Association of Chemical Engineers
- Scientific career
- Fields: Metallurgy, cold fusion
- Workplaces: University of Minnesota

Richard A. Oriani (July 19, 1920 – August 11, 2015) was an El Salvador-born American chemical engineer and metallurgist who was instrumental in the study of the effects of hydrogen in metal. He also made significant contributions to the field of cold fusion.

== Biography ==
Oriani was born in El Salvador in 1920, to a mother of Spanish descent and a father of Italian descent. The family emigrated to the US when he was 9 years old, and lived in Brooklyn, New York with his parents, brother Ernest and sister Elena.

In 1943, Oriani graduated from the College of the City of New York with a degree in chemical engineering. Although he was at the top of his class, Oriani had difficulty finding work because although his father had lived in Salvador for a number of years, he never pursued Salvadoran citizenship. Because of this, Oriani's passport was Italian, marking him as an "enemy alien." However, one of Oriani's professors helped him secure a position at the Bakelite Corporation Research Laboratory, where he worked on the study of adhesion and on the development of a military adhesive, for which he was granted a patent. This work kept him from induction into the Army, and in 1948 he earned his Ph.D. in physical chemistry from Princeton University.

Oriani then went to the General Electric Research Laboratory in Schenectady, New York, where, as a research associate, he studied, among other topics, the thermodynamics of solid metallic solutions, the order-disorder reaction in superlattice systems, nuclear magnetic measurements of hydrogen in metals, and Knight Shift measurements in liquid alloys. As a sideline, Oriani independently verified the high pressure technique developed at the GE Laboratory for the synthesis of a diamond. After ten years at GE, Oriani moved on to U.S. Steel's Bain Laboratory for Fundamental Research in which he served as assistant director and researcher on irreversible thermodynamics applied to metallurgy, nucleation, thermomigration, electromigration, impact adhesion, and hydrogen embrittlement of steel. In 1980 he retired from U.S. Steel and was invited to serve at the University of Minnesota as professor and director of a newly established Corrosion Research Center. He retired in 1999, but maintained an office and conducted research experiments there until 2014.

Oriani published over 200 articles in peer-reviewed journals during his long career. His early work focused on the thermodynamics of phase changes in metals and metal solutions, while his later work at U.S. Steel gained him worldwide respect for his advancements in the field of hydrogen embrittlement. Oriani's theory on the diffusion of hydrogen through metal and its tendency to embrittle metals by concentrating at certain defects became the first to reconcile the widely scattered observations and interpretations of hydrogen embrittlement. The work served as a foundation for subsequent researchers who expanded and refined Oriani's original theory, leading to a deep understanding of how one of the mankind's most important structural materials can fail catastrophically.

While serving as the director for the Corrosion Institute at the University of Minnesota, Oriani pioneered the use of the Kelvin probe to study corrosion of metals in a wide range of environments, including corrosion induced by humidity.

In 1989, Oriani's work expanded to include the growing and controversial field of cold fusion. In 1990, barely a year after the original announcement of excess energy in an electrochemical cell by Pons and Fleischmann, Oriani corroborated this finding using a sophisticated calorimetric technique. Oriani then focused on the nuclear origins of the excess energy, detecting and quantifying the emission of nuclear particles by electrochemical reactions. Oriani has conducted meaningful and successful collaborations with many researchers and theorists in the field, including John Fisher and Japan's Tadahiko Mizuno. He has published at least nine papers describing nuclear reactions unexplained by the present state of scientific knowledge, in spite of editorial bias against such revolutionary findings. If cold fusion becomes a reality, Oriani says, "It would open up a new area of nuclear physics entirely. It would augment nuclear physics as we understand it today." (November/December 2010, Issue 94, Infinite Energy)

An avid and self-taught musician, playing the viola and piano, he met his wife Constance at a musical group in New York. They married in 1949 and had 4 children.

=== Death ===
He died on August 11, 2015, in Edina, Minnesota.

== Awards and honors ==
- Fellow of the Electrochemical Society, 1994
- Fellow of NACE (National Association of Corrosion Engineers)
- Alexander Von Humboldt Prize, 1984
- The W.R.Whitney Award of the National Association of Corrosion Engineers.
- Fellow, American Society for Metals

== Frequently cited publications ==
Highly cited research paper according to SCI®: Oriani R A. The diffusion and trapping of hydrogen in steel. Acta Metall. 18:147–57, 1970. [E.C. Bain Lab. Fundamental Res., U.S. Steel Corp. Research Center, Monroeville, PA

Equilibrium Aspects of Hydrogen Induced Cracking of Steels By Oriani, R. A.; Josephic, P. H. From Acta Metallurgica (1974), 22(9), 1065–74. Language: English, Database: CAPLUS, doi:10.1016/0001-6160(74)90061-3

Generation of Nuclear Tracks During Electrolysis By Oriani, R. A.; Fisher, J. C. Edited By:Hagelstein, Peter L.; Chubb, Scott R From Japanese Journal of Applied Physics, Part 1: Regular Papers, Short Notes & Review Papers (2002), 41(10), 6180–6183. Language: English, Database: CAPLUS, doi:10.1143/JJAP.41.6180

Application of a Kelvin Microprobe to the Corrosion of Metals in Humid Atmospheres By Yee, Shelgon; Oriani, R. A.; Stratmann, M. From Journal of the Electrochemical Society (1991), 138(1), 55–61. Language: English, Database: CAPLUS, doi:10.1149/1.2085578

Anomalous Heavy Atomic Masses Produced by Electrolysis By Oriani, R. A. Edited By:Hagelstein, Peter L.; Chubb, Scott R From Fusion Technology (1998), 34(1), 76–80. Language: English, Database: CAPLUS

Effects of Applied Current Density and Potential Step on the Stress Generation during Anodic Oxidation of Tungsten in 0.1 M H_{2}SO_{4} Solution By Kim, Joong-Do; Pyun, Su-Il; Oriani, R. A. Edited By:Filimonov, V. A From Electrochimica Acta (1995), 40(9), 1171–6. Language: English, Database: CAPLUS, doi:10.1016/0013-4686(94)00351-Z

Stress Generation during Anodic Oxidation of Titanium and Aluminum By Nelson, J. C.; Oriani, R. A. From Corrosion Science (1993), 34(2), 307–26. Language: English, Database: CAPLUS, doi:10.1016/0010-938X(93)90009-6

Thermodynamics of Stressed Solids By Li, J. C. M.; Oriani, R. A.; Darken, L. S. From Z. Physik. Chem. (1966), 49(3–5), 271–290. Language: English, Database: CAPLUS

Rate of Coarsening of Copper Precipitate in an α-iron Matrix By Speich, Gilbert R.; Oriani, Richard A. From Transactions of the American Institute of Mining, Metallurgical and Petroleum Engineers (1965), 233(4), 623–31. Language: English, Database: CAPLUS

Mechanistic Theory of Hydrogen Embrittlement of Steels By Oriani, R. A. From Berichte der Bunsen-Gesellschaft (1972), 76(8), 848–57. Language: English, Database: CAPLUS
