= Yoshiaki Arata =

Japanese engineer (1924–2018)

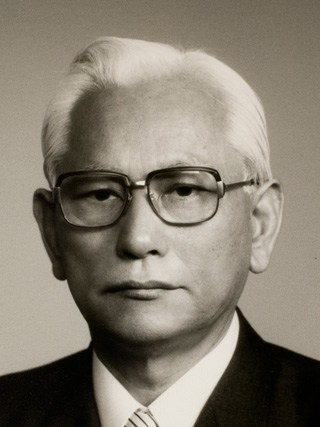
- Yoshiaki Arata
- Born: 22 May 1924; Kyoto Prefecture, Japan
- Died: 5 June 2018 (aged 94)
- Awards: Order of Culture of Japan
- Scientific career
- Fields: Cold fusion
- Institutions: Osaka University

Yoshiaki Arata (荒田 吉明, Arata Yoshiaki; 22 May 1924 – 5 June 2018) was a Japanese physicist. Arata was one of the pioneering researchers into nuclear fusion in Japan and a former professor at Osaka University. He was reported to be a strong nationalist, speaking only Japanese in public. He received the Order of Culture in 2006.

Arata started researching and publishing in the field of cold fusion around 1998, together with his colleague Yue Chang Zhang.

== Publications ==
- Y. Arata and Y. C. Zhang. "Achievement of intense 'cold' fusion reaction," Proceedings of the Japanese Academy, series B, 1990. 66:l.
- Y.Arata. Patent Application US 2006/0153752 A
