= Pamela Mosier-Boss =

American analytical chemist

Pamela A. Mosier-Boss
- Education: Kent State University; Michigan State University
- Scientific career
- Workplaces: United States Naval Research Laboratory
- Thesis: Physiochemical studies of crown-solvent complexations (1986)

Pamela A. Mosier-Boss is an American analytical chemist who spent her career at the Naval Information Warfare Center Pacific. Her research considered the development of environmental sensors and low-energy nuclear reaction.

== Early life and education ==
Mosier-Boss' mother was a nurse. Mosier-Boss studied biology and chemistry at Kent State University. She moved to Michigan State University for doctoral research, where she studied crown ether complexations.

== Research and career ==
Mosier-Boss worked on strategies to understand nuclear effects and near-surface interactions. She joined the United States Naval Research Laboratory, where she secured more patents than any woman in the history of the lab. She was based in the Naval Information Warfare Center Pacific, where she developed battery systems, piezoelectric ceramics and phages. Phages are viruses that are hosts to bacteria (e.g. anthrax). Mosier-Boss developed a strategy to attach phages, head-down, onto a grid. These grids could be attached to silicon chips, which would facilitate the determination of whether or not particular bacteria were present.

Mosier-Boss proposed that low-energy nuclear reactions could generate neutrons that could be used to fission uranium. Such an approach, so-called cold fusion, would eliminate the need for radioactive sources. In particular, Mosier-Boss developed a co-deposition process to deposit thin films of palladium and deuterium. In these devices, deuterium is compressed electrochemically within the palladium lattice, which can generate nuclear events. The co-deposition process involved the simultaneous deposition of deuterium and palladium from electrolytes that contain palladium salts dissolved in heavy water. The films must be deposited on a substrate that does not absorb hydrogen (e.g. gold) at high negative potentials. She worked on CR-39 as a nuclear track detector, which works by monitoring the ionization trails left after the atoms of CR-39 recoil in response to high energy neutrons. By treating these detectors with an etching system she showed that it was possible to differentiate triple tracks, which she assigned to alpha particles generated in the 12C(n,n′)3α carbon reaction. She went on to show that when the Pd cell was placed within an external field a transmutation occurs, which changes the surface morphology of the Pd/D films.

In 2013, Mosier-Boss was awarded the Infinite Energy Preparata Medal in recognition of her work on cold fusion.

== Selected publications ==
- Pamela A Mosier-Boss (8 June 2017). "Review of SERS Substrates for Chemical Sensing". Nanomaterials. 7 (6). doi:10.3390/nano7060142. ISSN 2079-4991. PMC 5485789. PMID 28594385. Wikidata Q33837921.
- Pamela A. Mosier-Boss (13 November 2017). "Review on SERS of Bacteria". Biosensors. 7 (4). doi:10.3390/bios7040051. ISSN 2079-6374. PMC 5746774. PMID 29137201. Wikidata Q47140108.
- P A Mosier-Boss; S H Lieberman; J M Andrews; F L Rohwer; L E Wegley; Mya Breitbart (1 September 2003). "Use of fluorescently labeled phage in the detection and identification of bacterial species". Applied Spectroscopy. 57 (9): 1138–1144. doi:10.1366/00037020360696008. ISSN 0003-7028. PMID 14611044. Wikidata Q46075288.
