= Eugene Mallove =

American science journalist

- Born: June 9, 1947
- Died: May 14, 2004 (aged 56); Norwich, Connecticut
- Cause of death: Murder
- Scientific career
- Workplaces: MIT, Boston University

The cover of Mallove's Fire from Ice: Searching for the Truth Behind the Cold Fusion Furor (1999)

Eugene Franklin Mallove (June 9, 1947 – May 14, 2004) was an American scientist, science writer, editor and publisher of Infinite Energy magazine, and founder of the nonprofit organization New Energy Foundation. He was a proponent of cold fusion, and a supporter of its research and related exploratory alternative energy topics, several of which are sometimes characterised as "fringe science".

Mallove authored Fire from Ice, a book detailing the 1989 report of tabletop cold fusion from Stanley Pons and Martin Fleischmann at the University of Utah. Among other things, the book claims the team did produce "greater-than-unity" output energy in an experiment successfully replicated on several occasions, but that the results were suppressed through an organized campaign of ridicule from mainstream physicists, including those studying controlled thermonuclear fusion, trying to protect their research and funding.

Mallove was murdered in 2004 while cleaning out his former childhood home, which had been rented out. Three people have been arrested and charged in connection with the killing; two were convicted of first-degree manslaughter and murder; the third pleaded guilty to obstruction of justice.

== Biography ==
Eugene Franklin Mallove was born on June 9, 1947, to Gladys (née' Alexander) and Mitchell Mallove. He grew up in Norwich, Connecticut and graduated from the Norwich Free Academy in 1965. From an early age, he showed great interest in science and especially astronomy. While in Boston, he met Joanne Smith, who was a student at Boston University. On September 9, 1970, Gene and Joanne married. They had two children, Kimberlyn, born in 1974, and Ethan, born in 1979.

Eugene Mallove held a BS (1969) and MS degree (1970) in aeronautical and astronautical engineering from MIT and a ScD degree (1975) in environmental health sciences from Harvard University. He had worked for technology engineering firms such as Hughes Research Laboratories, the Analytic Science Corporation, and MIT's Lincoln Laboratory, and he consulted in research and development of new energies.

In 1981, he and Gregory Matloff wrote a paper about using solar sails to reach Alpha Centauri, the nearest star to the Sun. They calculated that the trip would take several hundred years and that the ship would have to withstand accelerations of 60 g. They wrote several papers on that and other proposed methods of space travel, such as laser propulsion, the Bussard ramjet, and exotic fuels that could give very high power.

Mallove taught science journalism at MIT and Boston University and was chief science writer at MIT's news office, a position he left as part of a dispute with the school over cold fusion. Mallove resigned from MIT in 1991 because he said MIT was hiding cold fusion data, partly to protect funding for and reputation of traditional fusion research.

He was a science writer and broadcaster with the Voice of America radio service and author of three science books: The Quickening Universe: Cosmic Evolution and Human Destiny (1987, St. Martin's Press), The Starflight Handbook: A Pioneer’s Guide to Interstellar Travel (1989, John Wiley & Sons, with co-author Gregory Matloff), and Fire from Ice: Searching for the Truth Behind the Cold Fusion Furor (1991, John Wiley & Sons). He also published articles for numerous magazines and newspapers.

Mallove was a member of the Aurora Biophysics Research Institute (ABRI), one of the founders of the International Society of the Friends of Aetherometry, a member of its Organizing Committee, a co-inventor of the HYBORAC technology and one of the main evaluators of ABRI technologies.

His alternative energy research included studying the reproduction of Wilhelm Reich's Orgone Motor by Dr. Paulo Correa and Alexandra Correa, as well as the evolution of heat in the Reich–Einstein experiment. He was among the scientists and engineers who claimed to have confirmed the output of excess electric energy from tuned pulsed plasmas in vacuum arc discharges.

Mallove's combative stance against what he saw as the hypocrisy of mainstream science gave him a high-profile. Among other things, he was a frequent guest on the American radio program Coast to Coast AM.

In 1992, Mallove was a consultant on the ERR (Electromagnetic Radiation Receiver) project at the Noah's Ark Research Facility in the Philippines. He is also credited as a "cold fusion technical consultant", for providing advice to the producers of the movie The Saint from 1997, with a plot revolving around cold fusion formulas.

Eugene Mallove was a notable proponent and supporter of research into cold fusion. He authored the book Fire from Ice, which details the 1989 report of table-top cold fusion from Stanley Pons and Martin Fleischmann at the University of Utah. The book claims the team did produce "greater-than-unity" output energy in an experiment that was successfully replicated on several occasions. Mallove claims that the results were suppressed through an organized campaign of ridicule from mainstream physicists.

== Death ==
Eugene Mallove was killed on May 14, 2004, in Norwich, Connecticut, while cleaning a recently vacated rental property owned by his parents, the home he grew up in. The nature of Mallove's work led to some conspiracy theories regarding the homicide, but police suspected robbery as the motive.

In 2005, two local men were arrested in connection with the killing. The case proceeded slowly and the charges against the two men were finally dismissed on November 6, 2008.

On February 11, 2009, the State of Connecticut announced a $50,000 reward leading to the arrest and conviction of the person or persons responsible for the murder. On April 2, 2010, the police made two arrests in connection with the murder and said that more arrests were expected. On May 22, 2011, a state prosecutor said that they were charging a third person in connection with the killing. Court testimony indicated that Mallove may have been killed by an evicted tenant who was angry about belongings being disposed of during the clearout.

On April 20, 2012, the Norwich Bulletin stated that: "An ongoing murder trial came to an abrupt halt Friday when Chad Schaffer, of Norwich, decided to accept an offer of 16 years in prison, pleading guilty to the lesser charge of first-degree manslaughter in the 2004 beating death of Eugene Mallove." Mallove had just evicted Schaffer's parents, and he was cleaning the evicted house when Schaffer arrived and confronted him.

Mozelle Brown was convicted of Mallove's murder in October 2014 and on January 6, 2015, was sentenced to 58 years in prison. Schaffer's girlfriend, Candace Foster, testified against Brown and Schaffer, and pleaded guilty to a charge of hindering prosecution and tampering with evidence.

== Books ==
- Eugene F. Mallove (1987), The Quickening Universe (illustrated ed.), St Martins Pr; 1 edition, ISBN 978-0-312-00062-2
- Eugene F. Mallove and Gregory L. Matloff (1989), The Starflight Handbook (illustrated ed.), John Wiley & Sons; 1 edition, ISBN 978-0-471-61912-3
- Eugene F. Mallove (1991), Fire from Ice: Searching for the Truth Behind the Cold Fusion Furor, Wiley Science Editions (illustrated ed.), John Wiley & Sons, ISBN 978-0-471-53139-5
