= Peter L. Hagelstein =

American academic

Peter L. Hagelstein is an associate professor of electrical engineering at the Massachusetts Institute of Technology (MIT), affiliated with the Research Laboratory of Electronics (RLE).

Hagelstein received a B.S. and M.S. in 1976 and Ph.D. in electrical engineering in 1981, from MIT.

Hagelstein began his career at the Lawrence Livermore National Laboratory, working on high-energy laser and plasma physics from 1981 to 1985. While working in the Lawrence Livermore National Laboratory, he pioneered the work that later produced the first X-ray laser, which would later become important for the US Strategic Defense Initiative, popularly referred to as the "Star Wars" program. His work on X-ray lasers was honored with the Ernest Orlando Lawrence Award in 1984. Following this time, he took up an academic appointment at MIT in 1986.

In 1989, he started investigating cold fusion (also called low-energy nuclear reactions) with the hope of making a breakthrough similar to the X-ray laser. In the period between 1989 and 2004, the field became discredited in the eyes of many scientists. Hagelstein continued his research activity in the field, chairing the Tenth International Conference on Cold Fusion in 2003. On November 14, 2017, he gave a 90-minute presentation reviewing relevant experiments and describing possible mechanisms.

Following the cold fusion episode, his primary research has shifted to solid-state physics, including the development of new thermoelectric materials. In addition, he is active in education, writing a textbook on quantum and statistical mechanics.
