= Paul Palmer (physicist) =

American physicist (1926–2011)

E. Paul Palmer (1926–2011) was a Brigham Young University physicist who specialized in geophysics. He coined the term "cold fusion". However he was an early critic of Fleischmann and Pons's claims to have developed a useful method of cold fusion.

Palmer served in the US Navy during World War II. He later served as a missionary for the Church of Jesus Christ of Latter-day Saints in the East Central States Mission (primarily Tennessee and Kentucky). He received his bachelor's degree in physics from the University of Utah.

== Sources ==
- "Beating a Path to Fusion's Door". The New York Times. April 28, 1989.
- "History of Cold Fusion". Archived from the original on 2008-04-05.
- Provo Herald obituary for Palmer
