= Palladium hydride =

Metallic palladium

Palladium hydride is palladium metal with hydrogen within its crystal lattice. Despite its name, it is not an ionic hydride but rather an alloy of palladium with metallic hydrogen that can be written PdH_{x}. At room temperature, palladium hydrides may contain two crystalline phases, α and β (also called α′). Pure α-phase exists at x < 0.017 while pure β-phase exists at x > 0.58; intermediate values of x correspond to α–β mixtures.

Hydrogen absorption by palladium is reversible and therefore has been investigated for hydrogen storage. Palladium electrodes have been used in some cold fusion experiments, under the theory that hydrogen can be "squeezed" between palladium atoms to help it fuse at lower temperatures than normal.

== History ==
The absorption of hydrogen gas by palladium was first noted by T. Graham in 1866 and absorption of electrolytically produced hydrogen, where hydrogen was absorbed into a palladium cathode, was first documented in 1939. Graham produced an alloy with the composition PdH_{0.75}.

== Making palladium hydride ==
The hydrogen atoms occupy interstitial sites in palladium hydride. The H–H bond in H_{2} is cleaved. The ratio in which H is absorbed on Pd is defined by $x=\frac{[H]}{[Pd]}$. When Pd is brought into a H_{2} environment with a pressure of 1 atm, the resulting concentration of H reaches x ≈ 0.7. However, the concentration of H to obtain superconductivity is higher, in the range x > 0.75. This is done via three different routes, with measures to prevent the ready desorption of the hydrogen from the palladium.

The first route is loading from gas phase. A Pd sample is placed into a high-pressure cell of H_{2}, at room temperature. The H_{2} is added through a capillary. To maintain the high absorption, the pressure cell is cooled to liquid N_{2} temperature (77 K). The resulting concentration may be as high as [H]/[Pd] = 0.97.

The second route is electrochemical bonding. This is a method where the critical concentration for superconductivity can easily be exceeded without using a high-pressure environment, via a reaction as equilibrium between H in an electrochemical phase and H in a solid phase. The hydrogen is added to Pd and Pd–Ni alloys by an H concentration of ~ 0.95. Thereafter, it has been loaded into electrolysis of 0.1n-H_{2}SO_{4} with a current density of 50 to 150 mA/cm^{3}. Finally, after lowering the loading temperature to ~ 190 K, a H concentration of x ≈ 1 has been reached.

The third route is known as ion implantation. Before the implantation of H ions into Pd, the Pd foil was pre-charged with H. This is done in H_{2} high-temperature gas. This shortens the implantation time which follows. The concentration reached is about x ≈ 0.7. Afterwards the foil is cooled to a temperature of 77 K to prevent a loss of H before the implantation can take place. The implantation of H in PdH_{x} happens at a temperature of 4 K. The H ions penetrate in an H_{2}^{+}-beam. This results in a high concentration layer of H in a Pd foil.

== Chemical structure and properties ==
Palladium is sometimes metaphorically called a "metal sponge" (not to be confused with literal metal sponges) because it soaks up hydrogen "like a sponge soaks up water". At standard temperature and pressure, palladium can absorb up to 900 times its own volume of hydrogen. Hydrogen can be absorbed into the metal hydride and then desorbed back out for thousands of cycles. Researchers look for ways to extend the useful life of palladium storage.

=== Size effect ===
The absorption of hydrogen produces two different phases, both of which contain palladium metal atoms in a face-centered cubic (fcc, rocksalt) lattice, which is the same structure as pure palladium metal. At low concentrations up to PdH_{0.02} the palladium lattice expands slightly, from 388.9 pm to 389.5 pm. Above this concentration the second phase appears with a lattice constant of 402.5 pm. Both phases coexist until a composition of PdH_{0.58} when the alpha phase disappears. Neutron diffraction studies have shown that hydrogen atoms randomly occupy the octahedral interstices in the metal lattice (in an fcc lattice there is one octahedral hole per metal atom). The limit of absorption at normal pressures is PdH_{0.7}, indicating that about 70% of the octahedral holes are occupied. When x = 1 is reached, the octahedral interstices are fully occupied. The absorption of hydrogen is reversible, and hydrogen rapidly diffuses through the metal lattice. Metallic conductivity reduces as hydrogen is absorbed, until at around PdH_{0.5} the solid becomes a semiconductor.

This formation of the bulk hydride does depend on the size of the catalyst palladium. When palladium becomes smaller than 2.6 nm, hydrides are no longer formed.

Hydrogen dissolved in the bulk differ from hydrogen dissolved on the surface. When the particles of palladium decrease in size, less hydrogen dissolves in these smaller palladium particles. Therefore, relatively more hydrogen adsorbs on the surface of the small particles. This hydrogen adsorbed onto the particles do not form an hydride. Therefore, bigger particles have more places available for the formation of hydrides.

=== Electron and phonon band ===
The most important property of the band structure of PdH(oct) is that filled Pd states are lowered with the presence of hydrogen. Also, the lowest energy levels, which are the bonding states, of PdH are lower than that of Pd.

Additionally, empty Pd states, that are below the fermi energy, are also lowered with the presence of H.

Palladium prefers to be with hydrogen due to the interaction between the s state of hydrogen and the p states of palladium. The energy of an independent H atom lies in the energy range of the dominating p-states of the Pd bands.

Therefore, these empty states under the fermi-energy and holes in the d-band are filled.

Additionally, the hydride formation raises the fermi level above the d-band. Empty states, above the d-band, are also filled. This results in filled p-states and shifts the 'edge' to a higher energy level.

=== Superconductivity ===
PdH_{x} is a superconductor with a transition temperature T_{c} of about 9 K for x = 1. (Pure palladium is not superconducting.) Drops in resistivity vs. temperature curves were observed at higher temperatures (up to 273 K) in hydrogen-rich (x ≈ 1), nonstoichiometric palladium hydride and interpreted as superconducting transitions. These results have been questioned and have not been confirmed thus far.

A great advantage of palladium hydride over many other hydride systems is that palladium hydride does not need to be highly pressurized to become superconducting. This makes measurements easier and gives more opportunity for different kinds of measurements (many superconducting materials require extreme pressure in order to superconduct, on the order of 100 GPa). Palladium hydride could therefore also be used to explore the role that hydrogen plays in these hydride systems being superconductors.

=== Magnetic susceptibility ===
One of the magnetic properties of Palladium hydride is susceptibility. The susceptibility of PdH_{x} varies largely when changing the concentration of H. This is due to the β-phase of PdH_{x}. The α-phase of PdH lies in the same range of the fermi surface as Pd itself, therefore 𝛼-phase does not influence the susceptibility. However, the β-phase of PdH_{x} is characterized by s-electrons filling the d-band. Therefore, the susceptibility of the α–β mixture decreases at room temperature with an increasing concentration of H. Finally, when the spin fluctuations of pure Pd are decreased, the superconductivity will occur.

=== Specific heat capacity ===
Another metallic property is the electronic heat coefficient γ. This coefficient depends on the density of states. For pure Pd the heat coefficient is 9.5 mJ(mol⋅K^{2}). When H is added to the pure Pd, the electronic heat coefficient drops. For the range of x = 0.83 to x = 0.88γ is observed to be six times smaller than for pure Pd. This region is the superconducting region. However, Zimmerman et al. also measured the heat coefficient γ for a concentration of x = 0.96. A broadening of the superconducting transition was observed at this concentration. One of the reasons for this could be explained by an inhomogeneity of the macroscopic structure of PdH_{x}. γ at this value of x has a large fluctuation and is therefore uncertain.

The critical concentration for superconductivity to happen is estimated at x ≈ 0.72. The critical temperature or the superconducting transition temperature is estimated at 9 K. This was achieved at a stoichiometric concentration of x = 1.

Pressure also influences the critical temperature. It is shown that an increase in the pressure on PdH_{x} decreases T_{c}. This can be explained by a hardening of the phonon spectrum, which includes a decrease in the electron–phonon constant λ.

=== Surface absorption process ===
The process of absorption of hydrogen has been shown by scanning tunnelling microscopy to require aggregates of at least three vacancies on the surface of the crystal to promote the dissociation of the hydrogen molecule. The reason for such a behaviour and the particular structure of trimers has been analyzed.

== Uses ==
The absorption of hydrogen is reversible and is highly selective. A palladium-based diffuser separator is used, although they are not employed industrially. Impure gas is passed through tubes of thin walled silver–palladium alloy as protium and deuterium readily diffuse through the alloy membrane. The gas that comes through is pure and ready for use. Palladium is alloyed with silver to improve its strength and resistance to embrittlement. To ensure that the formation of the beta phase is avoided, as the lattice expansion noted earlier would cause distortions and splitting of the membrane, the temperature is maintained above 300 °C.

Another use of palladium hydride is increased adsorption of H_{2}-molecules with respect to pure palladium. In 2009, a study was conducted which tested this fact. At a pressure of 1 bar, the probability was measured of Hydrogen molecules sticking to the surface of Palladium versus the probability of sticking to surface of palladium hydride. The sticking probability of Palladium was found to be greater at temperatures where the phase of the used Palladium and hydrogen mixture was pure β-phase, which is in this context corresponds to palladium hydride (at 1 bar this means temperatures greater than roughly 160 degrees Celsius), as opposed to temperatures where β- and α-phases coexist and even lower temperatures where there is pure α-phase (α-phase here corresponds to a solid solution of Hydrogen atoms in Palladium). Knowing these sticking probabilities enables one to calculate the rate of adsorption $r_\text{a}$ by virtue of the equation

$$r_\text{a} = S\Phi_\text{H}$$

where $S$ is the aforementioned sticking probability and $\Phi_\text{H}$ is the flux of hydrogen molecules in the toward the surface of the palladium/palladium-hydride.

When the system is in a steady state, we must have that the rate of adsorption and, oppositely, the rate of desorption ($r_\text{d}$) are equal. This gives

$$r_\text{a} = r_\text{d}$$

The rate of desorption is assumed to be given by a Boltzmannian distribution, i.e.

(*) $r_\text{d} = e^{-\frac{E_\text{d}}{k_\text{B} T}}$

where $C$ is some unknown constant,$E_\text{d}$ is the desorption energy, $k_\text{B}$ is the Boltzmann constant and $T$ is the temperature.

The relation (*) can be fitted to find the value of $E_\text{d}$. It was found that, within the uncertainty of their experiment, the values for of Palladium and Palladium hydride respectively were roughly equal. Thus palladium hydride has as higher average adsorption rate than Palladium, while the energy required for desorption is the same.

Density functional theory was performed to find an explanation for this fact. It was found that the bond of hydrogen with the palladium hydride surface is weaker than the bond with the palladium surface and that the desorption activation barrier is lower by a small amount for Palladium hydride than for palladium, although the adsorption barriers are comparable in magnitude. Moreover, the heat of adsorption is lower for palladium hydride than for Palladium, which leads to lower equilibrium surface coverage of H. This means that the surface of palladium hydride would be less saturated, which leads to greater opportunity for sticking, i.e. a higher sticking probability.

The reversible absorption of palladium is a means to store hydrogen, and the above findings indicate that even in the hydrogen-absorbed state of palladium, there is further opportunity for hydrogen storing.

== See also ==
- Hydrogen sensor
