= Faraday-efficiency effect =

Cause of data interpretation errors in electrochemistry

The Faraday-efficiency effect refers to the potential for misinterpretation of data from experiments in electrochemistry through failure to take into account a Faraday efficiency of less than 100 percent.

== Assumption about efficiency ==
Until recent decades it was common to assume that the release of hydrogen and oxygen gas during electrolysis of water always has a Faraday efficiency of 100%. Pons and Fleischmann, and other investigators who reported the finding of anomalous excess heat in electrolytic cells, all relied on this popular assumption. No one bothered to measure the Faraday efficiency in their cells during the experiments. Many publications reporting the finding of excess heat included an explicit statement like: "The Faraday efficiency is assumed to be unity." Even if not explicitly stated so, these publications included this implicit assumption in the formulas used to calculate the cells' energy balance.

== Relevance to cold fusion ==
Lacking any other plausible explanation, the anomalous excess heat produced during such electrolysis was attributed by Pons and Fleischmann to cold fusion. Later, it was discovered that such excess heat can easily be the product of conventional chemistry, i.e. internal recombination of hydrogen and oxygen. Such recombination leads to a reduction in the Faraday efficiency of the electrolysis. The Faraday-efficiency effect is the observation of anomalous excess heat due to a reduction in the Faraday efficiency.

== Measurement ==
From 1991-1993 a group of investigators, headed by Zvi Shkedi, in the state of Massachusetts, USA, built well-insulated cells and calorimeters which included the capability to measure the actual Faraday efficiency in real-time during the experiments. The cells were of the light-water type; with a fine-wire nickel cathode; a platinum anode; and K_{2}CO_{3} electrolyte.

The calorimeters were calibrated to an accuracy of 0.02% of input power. The long-term stability of the calorimeters was verified over a period of 9 months of continuous operation. In their publication, the investigators show details of their calorimeters' design and teach the technology of achieving high calorimetric accuracy.

=== Experiments ===
A total of 64 experiments were performed in which the actual Faraday efficiency was measured. The results were analyzed twice; once with the popular assumption that the Faraday efficiency is 100%, and, again, taking into account the measured Faraday efficiency in each experiment. The average Faraday efficiency measured in these experiments was 78%.

=== First analysis ===
The first analysis, assuming a Faraday efficiency of 100%, yielded an average apparent excess heat of 21% of input power. The term "apparent excess heat" was coined by the investigators to indicate that the actual Faraday efficiency was ignored in the analysis.

=== Second analysis ===
The second analysis, taking into account the measured Faraday efficiency, yielded an actual excess heat of 0.13% +/- 0.48%. In other words, when the actual Faraday efficiency was measured and taken into account, the energy balance of the cells was zero, with no excess heat.

=== Conclusion ===
This investigation has shown how conventional chemistry, i.e. internal recombination of hydrogen and oxygen, accounted for the entire amount of apparent excess heat. The investigators concluded their publication with the following word of advice:

"All reports claiming the observation of excess heat should be accompanied by simultaneous measurements of the actual Faraday efficiency."

Jones et al. have confirmed the Shkedi et al. findings with the same conclusion:

"Faradaic efficiencies less than 100% during electrolysis of water can account for reports of excess heat in 'cold fusion' cells."
