= Widom–Larsen theory =

Scientific theory

The Widom–Larsen theory is a proposed explanation for supposed Low Energy Nuclear Reactions (LENR) developed in 2005 by Allan Widom and Lewis Larsen. In the paper describing the idea, they claim that ultra low momentum neutrons are produced in the cold fusion apparatuses during weak interactions when protons capture "heavy" electrons from metallic hydride surfaces. One source has held that it is "unlikely the electron energy threshold for neutron production can be reached in a metal lattice system without a substantial energy input".

The idea was expanded by Yogendra Srivastava together with Widom and Larsen in 2014, who went on to propose that it could be an explanation for neutrons observed in exploding wire experiments, solar corona and flares, and neutron production in thunderstorms. However, unrealistic concentrations of free electrons are needed for the neutron yield to be a significant component of thunderstorm neutrons, discounting the explanation.
