= Constanza Oriani =

Argentine fencer (born 1962)

Personal information
- Born: 14 April 1962 (age 64)

Sport
- Sport: Fencing

Constanza Oriani (born 14 April 1962) is an Argentine fencer. She competed in the women's team foil event at the 1984 Summer Olympics.
