= Chevrolet Low Cab Forward =

The Chevrolet Low Cab Forward (LCF) is line of commercial cab-over vehicles sold by Chevrolet in the United States since 2016. It can refer to:

- A rebadge of the Isuzu Elf, for the 3500, 4500, and 5500 models
- A rebadge of the Isuzu Forward, for the 6500 and 7500 models
