= Launch control =

The term launch control can refer to:

- Launch control (automotive), an automotive control option
- A spaceport, a rocket launch site
- A missile launch control center, used to launch US ICBMs
- Launch control (rocketry), generic term for a control center used to launch rockets and missiles

There are also specific facilities that use the name Launch Control:

- Launch Control Center at Kennedy Space Center

== See also ==
- Launch (disambiguation)
- Control (disambiguation)
