= Therapeutic Innovation & Regulatory Science =

- Discipline: Pharmacology
- Language: English
- Edited by: Gregory W. Daniel

Publication details
- Former names: Drug Information Bulletin, Drug Information Journal
- History: 1967–present
- Publisher: Springer Nature on behalf of the Drug Information Association
- Frequency: Bimonthly
- Impact factor: 1.778 (2020)

Standard abbreviations
- ISO 4: Ther. Innov. Regul. Sci.

Indexing
- ISSN: 2168-4790 (print); 2168-4804 (web)
- LCCN: 77012536
- OCLC no.: 643875368

Links
- Journal homepage; Online access; Online archive

Therapeutic Innovation & Regulatory Science is a bimonthly peer-reviewed medical journal that covers research and developments concerning pharmaceuticals and the development and use of medical products. It is published by Springer Nature on behalf of the Drug Information Association. The journal was established in 1967 as the Drug Information Bulletin and renamed to Drug Information Journal in 1971, before obtaining its current title in 2013. The editor-in-chief is Gregory W. Daniel.

== Abstracting and indexing ==
The journal is abstracted and indexed in:

- Biological Sciences
- Current Index to Statistics
- EMBASE/Excerpta Medica
- Environmental Sciences and Pollution Management
- Health & Safety Sciences Abstracts
- International Bibliography of Periodical Literature on the Humanities and Social Sciences
- International Pharmaceutical Abstracts
- Library & Information Science Abstracts
- ProQuest
- Risk Abstracts
- Science Citation Index Expanded
- Scopus
- TOC Premier
- Toxicology Abstracts
