= Lattice confinement fusion =

Type of nuclear fusion

Lattice confinement fusion (LCF) is a type of nuclear fusion in which deuteron-saturated metals are exposed to high energy photons or ion beams avoiding the confined high-temperature plasmas used in other methods of fusion.

== History ==
In 2020, a team of NASA researchers seeking a new energy source for deep-space exploration missions published the first paper describing a method for triggering nuclear fusion in the space between the atoms of a metal solid, an example of screened fusion. The experiments did not produce self-sustaining reactions, and the electron source itself was energetically expensive.

== Technique ==
The reaction is fueled with deuterium (^{2}H), a stable isotope of hydrogen composed of one proton, one neutron, and one electron. The deuterium is confined in the space between the atoms of a metal solid such as erbium or titanium. Erbium can indefinitely maintain 10^{23} cm^{−3} deuterium atoms at room temperature. The deuteron-saturated metal forms an overall neutral plasma. The electron density of the metal reduces the likelihood that two deuterium nuclei (deuterons) will repel each other as they get closer together.

A dynamitron electron-beam accelerator generates an electron beam that hits a tantalum target and produces gamma rays, irradiating titanium deuteride or erbium deuteride. A gamma ray of about 2.2 megaelectronvolts (MeV) strikes a deuteron and splits it into proton and neutron. The neutron collides with another deuteron. This second, energetic deuteron can experience screened fusion or a stripping reaction.

Though the lattice is notionally at room temperature, LCF creates an energetic environment inside the lattice where individual atoms achieve fusion-level energies. Heated regions are created at the micrometer scale.

=== Screened fusion ===
The energetic deuteron fuses with another deuteron, yielding either a ^{3}He nucleus and a neutron or a ^{3}H nucleus and a proton. These fusion products may fuse with other deuterons, creating an alpha particle, or with another ^{3}He or ^{3}H nucleus. Each releases energy, continuing the process.

=== Stripping reaction ===
In a stripping reaction, the metal strips a neutron from accelerated deuteron and fuses it with the metal, yielding a different isotope of the metal. If the produced metal isotope is radioactive, it may decay into another element, releasing energy in the form of ionizing radiation in the process.

=== Palladium-silver ===
A related technique pumps deuterium gas through the wall of a palladium-silver alloy tubing. The palladium is electrolytically loaded with deuterium. In some experiments this produces fast neutrons that trigger further reactions. Other experimenters (Fralick et al.) also made claims of anomalous heat produced by this system.

== Comparison to other fusion techniques ==
Pyroelectric fusion has previously been observed in erbium hydrides. A high-energy beam of deuterium ions generated by pyroelectric crystals was directed at a stationary, room-temperature Er^{2}H_{2} or Er^{3}H_{2} target, and fusion was observed.

In previous fusion research, such as inertial confinement fusion (ICF), fuel such as the rarer tritium is subjected to high pressure for a nano-second interval, triggering fusion. In magnetic confinement fusion (MCF), the fuel is heated in a plasma to temperatures much higher than those at the center of the Sun. In LCF, conditions sufficient for fusion are created in a metal lattice that is held at ambient temperature during exposure to high-energy photons. ICF devices momentarily reach densities of 10^{26} cc^{−1}, while MCF devices momentarily achieve 10^{14}.

Lattice confinement fusion requires energetic deuterons and is therefore not cold fusion.

== See also ==
- Inertial confinement fusion
- Magnetized target fusion
- Pyroelectric fusion
