= Accountability in Research =

- Language: English
- Edited by: Lisa M. Rasmussen

Publication details
- History: 1989–present
- Publisher: Taylor & Francis
- Frequency: bimonthly
- Impact factor: 4.4 (2025)

Standard abbreviations
- ISO 4: Account. Res.

Indexing
- CODEN: ARQAEZ
- ISSN: 0898-9621 (print); 1545-5815 (web)
- OCLC no.: 17959730

Links
- Journal homepage

Accountability in Research is a peer-reviewed academic journal examining systems for ensuring research integrity in the conduct of biomedical research. It was started by Gordon and Breach and is currently published by Taylor & Francis.

== Aim and Scope ==
Accountability in Research is devoted to the examination and critical analysis of practices and systems for promoting integrity in the conduct of research. It provides an interdisciplinary, international forum for the development of ethics, procedures, standards, policies, and concepts to encourage the ethical conduct of research and to enhance the validity of research results.

The journal welcomes original work on advancing research integrity in the form of empirical research, conceptual assessment, and critical analysis in all fields of science, including biology, chemistry, physics, medicine, law, economics, statistics, management studies, public policy, politics, sociology, history, psychology, philosophy, ethics, and information science. The journal seeks to publish research that makes a significant contribution to the literature and advances knowledge of accountability and integrity in research. With some exceptions, the journal is not interested in publishing studies that merely duplicate previous work or are limited in generalizability (e.g., due to problems with statistical design or research focus) or that do not meaningfully contribute to the scholarly literature.

== Editorial board ==
=== Editor-in-Chief ===
The editor-in-chief is Lisa M. Rasmussen (University of North Carolina at Charlotte).

=== Associate Editors ===
David B. Resnik, Ph.D.

Associate Editor for “Normative Ethics” and Letters to the Editor

National Institute of Environmental Health Sciences

Zubin Master, Ph.D.

Associate Editor for Commentaries

Biomedical Ethics Research Program

Mayo Clinic

Alison Antes, Ph.D.

Bioethics Research Center

School of Medicine

Washington University in St. Louis

Sam Bruton, Ph.D.

Professor of Philosophy and Director of the Office of Research Integrity

University of Southern Mississippi

Mohammad Hosseini, Ph.D.

Department of Preventive Medicine (Health and Biomedical Informatics)

Feinberg School of Medicine

Northwestern University

Kelly Laas, MLIS

Center for the Study of Ethics in the Professions

Illinois Institute of Technology

Kirstin R.W. Matthews, Ph.D.

Baker Institute for Public Policy

Rice University

Toby Schonfeld, Ph.D.

National Center for Ethics in Health Care

== Journal metrics ==
- 2.8 (2023) Impact Factor
- Q1 Impact Factor Best Quartile
- 3.5 (2023) 5 year IF
- 4.9 (2023) CiteScore (Scopus)
- Q1 CiteScore Best Quartile
- 1.295 (2023) SNIP
- 0.623 (2023) SJR
