= International Conference on Cold Fusion =

Annual conference

- Abbreviation: ICCF
- Discipline: Cold fusion

Publication details
- Publisher: 2011-present: International Society for Condensed Matter Nuclear Science
- History: 1990–

The International Conference on Cold Fusion (ICCF) (also referred to as Annual Conference on Cold Fusion in 1990-1991 and mostly as International Conference on Condensed Matter Nuclear Science since 2007) is an annual or biennial conference on the topic of cold fusion. An international conference on cold fusion was held in Santa Fe, New Mexico, USA in 1989. However, the first ICCF conference (ICCF1) took place in 1990 in Salt Lake City, Utah, USA, under the title "First Annual Conference on Cold Fusion". Its location has since rotated between Russia, the USA, Europe, and Asia. It was held in India for the first time in 2011. The conferences have been criticized as events which attract "crackpots" and "pseudo-scientists".

== Reception ==
The First Annual Conference on Cold Fusion was held in March 1990 in Salt Lake City, Utah, United States. Robert L. Park of the American Physical Society derisively referred to it as a "seance of true believers." The conference was attended by more than 200 researchers from the United States, Italy, Japan, India and Taiwan and dozens of reporters from all over the U.S. and abroad.

The Third International Conference on Cold Fusion was held in 1992 in Nagoya, Japan. It was described by The New York Times, "depending on one's point of view" as "either a turning point in which evidence was presented that will convince the skeptics that cold fusion exists or a religious revival where claims of miracles were lapped up by ardent believers." The conference was sponsored by seven Japanese scientific societies, it was attended by 200 Japanese scientists and more than 100 from abroad. Tomohiro Taniguchi, then director of the Electric Power Technology Division at Japan's Ministry of International Trade and Industry, reportedly said that the Ministry of International Trade and Industry was willing to finance research in the field in view of "encouraging evidence, especially after the conference." The conference was also covered by the Associated Press.

A journalist for the Wired magazine attended the 1998 conference in Vancouver—apparently the only mainstream journalist who attended—and reported that he found there "about 200 extremely conventional-looking scientists, almost all of them male and over 50" with some apparently over 70. He then inferred that "[the] younger ones had bailed years ago, fearing career damage from the cold fusion stigma." He reported seeing "highly technical presentations" and "was amazed by the quantity of the work, its quality, and the credentials of the people pursuing it", whereas "[a] few obvious pseudoscientists, promoting their ideas in an adjoining room used for poster sessions, were politely ignored."

By 1999, attendance by researchers at the ICCF meetings drew comment from the field of science studies. Although scientific debate over cold fusion had effectively ended in 1990, attendance at the ICCF meetings for the next 8 years had been relatively stable at between 100 and 300. Sociologist Bart Simon of Concordia University described the state of the field as "undead", and considered that the conference evidenced that "as far as normal science is concerned, [cold fusion] is of interest to crackpots, pseudo-scientists, frauds and a few sociologists of science".

David Goodstein has written that although an ICCF event had "all the trappings of a normal scientific meeting", it was in fact "no normal scientific conference" since "cold fusion was a pariah field, cast out by the scientific establishment". It was an environment, he added, "...in which crackpots flourished, and this made matters worse for those who were at least willing to entertain the notion that there might have been some serious science going on."

== Conferences ==
The conference is organized by The International Society for Condensed Matter Nuclear Science. Conference attendees include "a mix of professional scientists, along with retired, semi-retired and amateur scientists, engineers and technicians, and a number of entrepreneurs, inventors, and interested lay people." Conferences have been held in Europe, USA, Canada, China, India, Russia, Korea, Japan.

- ICCF-1 - 1989, Santa Fe, New Mexico, USA
- ICCF-23 - June 2021, Fujian, China
- ICCF-24 - July 2022, Mountain View, California
- ICCF-25 - August 2023, Szczecin, Poland
- ICCF-26 - 26-30 May 2025, Morioka, Japan

See the Japanese version of this page for a comprehensive list of past conferences.
