= History of electrochemistry =

Electrochemistry, a branch of chemistry, went through several changes during its evolution from early principles related to magnets in the early 16th and 17th centuries, to complex theories involving conductivity, electric charge and mathematical methods. The term electrochemistry was used to describe electrical phenomena in the late 19th and 20th centuries. In recent decades, electrochemistry has become an area of current research, including research in batteries and fuel cells, preventing corrosion of metals, the use of electrochemical cells to remove refractory organics and similar contaminants in wastewater electrocoagulation and improving techniques in refining chemicals with electrolysis and electrophoresis.

== Background and dawn of electrochemistry ==
The 16th century marked the beginning of scientific understanding of electricity and magnetism that culminated with the production of electric power and the Industrial Revolution in the late 19th century.

In the 1550s, English scientist William Gilbert spent 17 years experimenting with magnetism and, to a lesser extent, electricity. For his work on magnets, Gilbert became known as "The Father of Magnetism." His book De Magnete quickly became the standard work throughout Europe on electrical and magnetic phenomena, and made a clear distinction between magnetism and what was then called the "amber effect" (static electricity).

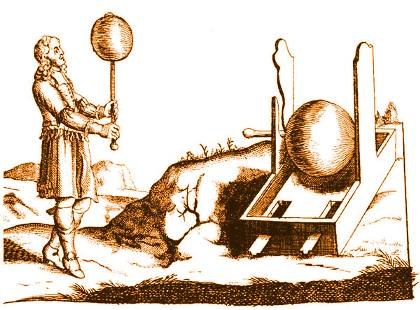
German physicist Otto von Guericke beside his electrical generator while conducting experiment.

In 1663, German physicist Otto von Guericke created the first electrostatic generator, which produced static electricity by applying friction. The generator was made of a large sulfur ball inside a glass globe, mounted on a shaft. The ball was rotated by means of a crank and a static electric spark was produced when a pad was rubbed against the ball as it rotated. The globe could be removed and used as an electrical source for experiments with electricity. Von Guericke used his generator to show that like charges repelled each other.

== The 18th century and birth of electrochemistry ==
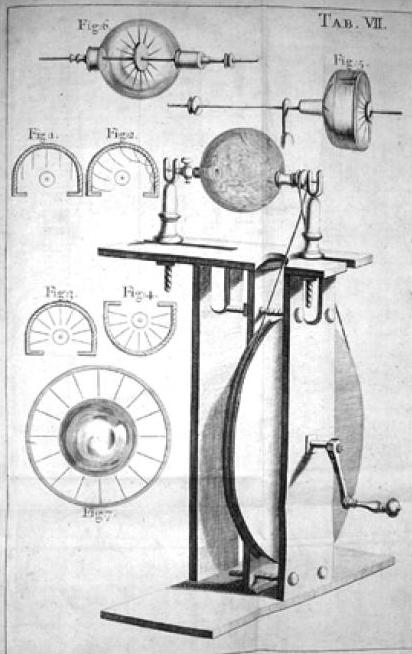
Francis Hauksbee's gas-discharge lamp

In 1709, Francis Hauksbee at the Royal Society in London discovered that by putting a small amount of mercury in the glass of Von Guericke's generator and evacuating the air from it, it would glow whenever the ball built up a charge and his hand was touching the globe. He had created the first gas-discharge lamp.

Between 1729 and 1736, two English scientists, Stephen Gray and Jean Desaguliers, performed a series of experiments which showed that a cork or other object as far away as 800 or 900 feet (245–275 m) could be electrified by connecting it via a charged glass tube to materials such as metal wires or hempen string. They found that other materials, such as silk, would not convey the effect.

By the mid-18th century, French chemist Charles François de Cisternay Du Fay had discovered two forms of static electricity, and that like charges repel each other while unlike charges attract. Du Fay announced that electricity consisted of two fluids: vitreous (from the Latin for "glass"), or positive, electricity; and resinous, or negative, electricity. This was the "two-fluid theory" of electricity, which was opposed by Benjamin Franklin's "one-fluid theory" later in the century.

In 1745, Jean-Antoine Nollet developed a theory of electrical attraction and repulsion that supposed the existence of a continuous flow of electrical matter between charged bodies. Nollet's theory at first gained wide acceptance, but met resistance in 1752 with the translation of Franklin's Experiments and Observations on Electricity into French. Franklin and Nollet debated the nature of electricity, with Franklin supporting action at a distance and two qualitatively opposing types of electricity, and Nollet advocating mechanical action and a single type of electrical fluid. Franklin's argument eventually won and Nollet's theory was abandoned.

In 1748, Nollet invented one of the first electrometers, the electroscope, which showed electric charge using electrostatic attraction and repulsion. Nollet is reputed to be the first to apply the name "Leyden jar" to the first device for storing electricity. Nollet's invention was replaced by Horace-Bénédict de Saussure's electrometer in 1766.

By the 1740s, William Watson had conducted several experiments to determine the speed of electricity. The general belief at the time was that electricity was faster than sound, but no accurate test had been devised to measure the velocity of a current. Watson, in the fields north of London, laid out a line of wire supported by dry sticks and silk which ran for 12,276 feet (3.7 km). Even at this length, the velocity of electricity seemed instantaneous.

By the 1750s, as the study of electricity became popular, efficient ways of producing electricity were sought. The generator developed by Jesse Ramsden was among the first electrostatic generators invented. Electricity produced by such generators was used to treat paralysis, muscle spasms, and to control heart rates. Other medical uses of electricity included filling the body with electricity, drawing sparks from the body, and applying sparks from the generator to the body.

Charles-Augustin de Coulomb developed the law of electrostatic attraction in 1781 as an outgrowth of his attempt to investigate the law of electrical repulsions as stated by Joseph Priestley in England. To this end, he invented a sensitive apparatus to measure the electrical forces involved in Priestley's law. He also established the inverse square law of attraction and repulsion magnetic poles, which became the basis for the mathematical theory of magnetic forces developed by Siméon Denis Poisson. Coulomb wrote seven important works on electricity and magnetism which he submitted to the Académie des Sciences between 1785 and 1791, in which he reported having developed a theory of attraction and repulsion between charged bodies, and went on to search for perfect conductors and dielectrics. He suggested that there was no perfect dielectric, proposing that every substance has a limit, above which it will conduct electricity. The SI unit of charge is called a coulomb in his honour.

In 1789, Franz Aepinus developed a device with the properties of a "condenser" (now known as a capacitor.) The Aepinus condenser was the first capacitor developed after the Leyden jar, and was used to demonstrate conduction and induction. The device was constructed so that the space between two plates could be adjusted, and the glass dielectric separating the two plates could be removed or replaced with other materials.

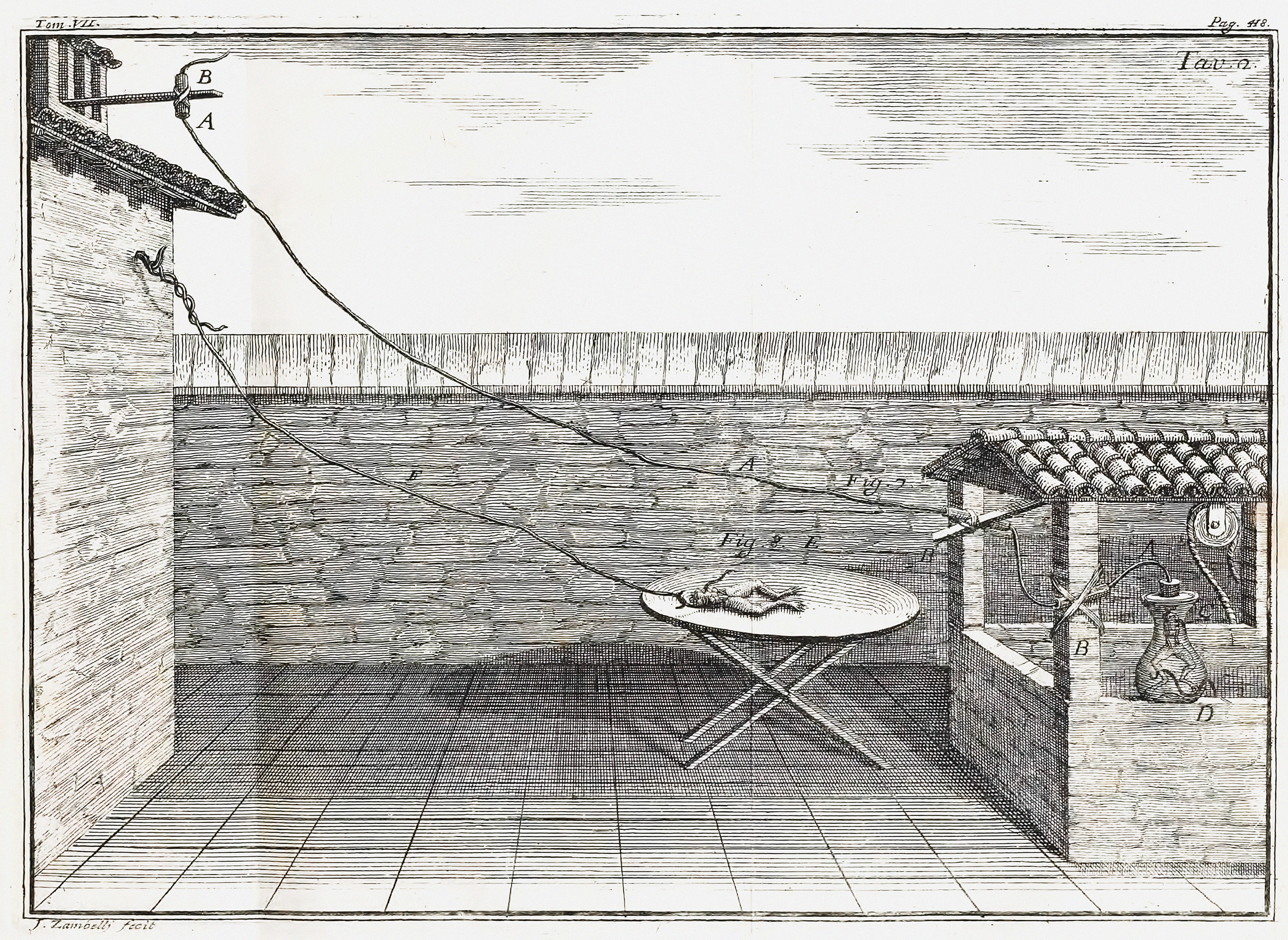
Late 1780s diagram of Galvani's experiment on frog legs.

Despite the gain in knowledge of electrical properties and the building of generators, it was not until the late 18th century that Italian physician and anatomist Luigi Galvani marked the birth of electrochemistry by establishing a bridge between muscular contractions and electricity with his 1791 essay De Viribus Electricitatis in Motu Musculari Commentarius (Commentary on the Effect of Electricity on Muscular Motion), where he proposed a "nerveo-electrical substance" in life forms.

In his essay, Galvani concluded that animal tissue contained a before-unknown innate, vital force, which he termed "animal electricity," which activated muscle when placed between two metal probes. He believed that this was evidence of a new form of electricity, separate from the "natural" form that is produced by lightning and the "artificial" form that is produced by friction (static electricity). He considered the brain to be the most important organ for the secretion of this "electric fluid" and that the nerves conducted the fluid to the muscles. He believed the tissues acted similarly to the outer and inner surfaces of Leyden jars. The flow of this electric fluid provided a stimulus to the muscle fibres.

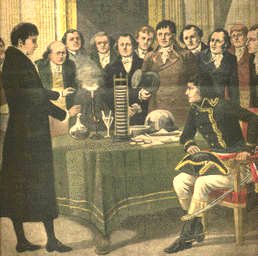
Italian physicist Alessandro Volta showing his "battery" to French emperor Napoleon Bonaparte in the early 19th century.

Galvani's scientific colleagues generally accepted his views, but Alessandro Volta, the outstanding professor of physics at the University of Pavia, was not convinced by the analogy between muscles and Leyden jars. Deciding that the frogs' legs used in Galvani's experiments served only as an electroscope, he held that the contact of dissimilar metals was the true source of stimulation. He referred to the electricity so generated as "metallic electricity" and decided that the muscle, by contracting when touched by metal, resembled the action of an electroscope. Furthermore, Volta claimed that if two dissimilar metals in contact with each other also touched a muscle, agitation would also occur and increase with the dissimilarity of the metals. Galvani refuted this by obtaining muscular action using two pieces of similar metal. Volta's name was later used for the unit of electrical potential, the volt.

== Rise of electrochemistry as branch of chemistry ==
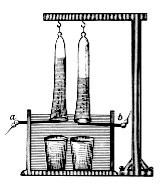
Scheme of Ritter's apparatus to separate water into hydrogen and oxygen by electrolysis

In 1800, English chemists William Nicholson and Johann Wilhelm Ritter succeeded in separating water into hydrogen and oxygen by electrolysis. Soon thereafter, Ritter discovered the process of electroplating. He also observed that the amount of metal deposited and the amount of oxygen produced during an electrolytic process depended on the distance between the electrodes. By 1801 Ritter had observed thermoelectric currents, which anticipated the discovery of thermoelectricity by Thomas Johann Seebeck.

In 1802, William Cruickshank designed the first electric battery capable of mass production. Like Volta, Cruickshank arranged square copper plates, which he soldered at their ends, together with plates of zinc of equal size. These plates were placed into a long rectangular wooden box which was sealed with cement. Grooves inside the box held the metal plates in position. The box was then filled with an electrolyte of brine, or watered down acid. This flooded design had the advantage of not drying out with use and provided more energy than Volta's arrangement, which used brine-soaked papers between the plates.

In the quest for a better production of platinum metals, two scientists, William Hyde Wollaston and Smithson Tennant, worked together to design an efficient electrochemical technique to refine or purify platinum. Tennant ended up discovering the elements iridium and osmium. Wollaston's effort, in turn, led him to the discovery of the metals palladium in 1803 and rhodium in 1804.

Wollaston made improvements to the galvanic battery (named after Galvani) in the 1810s. In Wollaston's battery, the wooden box was replaced with an earthenware vessel, and a copper plate was bent into a U-shape, with a single plate of zinc placed in the center of the bent copper. The zinc plate was prevented from making contact with the copper by dowels (pieces) of cork or wood. In his single cell design, the U-shaped copper plate was welded to a horizontal handle for lifting the copper and zinc plates out of the electrolyte when the battery was not in use.

In 1809, Samuel Thomas von Soemmering developed the first telegraph. He used a device with 26 wires (1 wire for each letter of the German alphabet) terminating in a container of acid. At the sending station, a key, which completed a circuit with a battery, was connected as required to each of the line wires. The passage of current caused the acid to decompose chemically, and the message was read by observing at which of the terminals the bubbles of gas appeared. This is how he was able to send messages, one letter at a time.

Humphry Davy's work with electrolysis led to conclusion that the production of electricity in simple electrolytic cells resulted from chemical reactions between the electrolyte and the metals, and occurred between substances of opposite charge. He reasoned that the interactions of electric currents with chemicals offered the most likely means of decomposing all substances to their basic elements. These views were explained in 1806 in his lecture On Some Chemical Agencies of Electricity, for which he received the Napoleon Prize from the Institut de France in 1807 (despite the fact that England and France were at war at the time). This work led directly to the isolation of sodium and potassium from their common compounds and of the alkaline earth metals from theirs in 1808.

Hans Christian Ørsted's discovery of the magnetic effect of electric currents in 1820 was immediately recognised as an important advance, although he left further work on electromagnetism to others. André-Marie Ampère quickly repeated Ørsted's experiment, and formulated them mathematically (which became Ampère's law). Ørsted also discovered that not only is a magnetic needle deflected by the electric current, but that the live electric wire is also deflected in a magnetic field, thus laying the foundation for the construction of an electric motor. Ørsted's discovery of piperine, one of the pungent components of pepper, was an important contribution to chemistry, as was his preparation of aluminium in 1825.

During the 1820s, Robert Hare developed the Deflagrator, a form of voltaic battery having large plates used for producing rapid and powerful combustion. A modified form of this apparatus was employed in 1823 in volatilising and fusing carbon. It was with these batteries that the first use of voltaic electricity for blasting under water was made in 1831.

In 1821, the Estonian-German physicist, Thomas Johann Seebeck, demonstrated the electrical potential in the juncture points of two dissimilar metals when there is a temperature difference between the joints. He joined a copper wire with a bismuth wire to form a loop or circuit. Two junctions were formed by connecting the ends of the wires to each other. He then accidentally discovered that if he heated one junction to a high temperature, and the other junction remained at room temperature, a magnetic field was observed around the circuit.

He did not recognise that an electric current was being generated when heat was applied to a bi-metal junction. He used the term "thermomagnetic currents" or "thermomagnetism" to express his discovery. Over the following two years, he reported on his continuing observations to the Prussian Academy of Sciences, where he described his observation as "the magnetic polarization of metals and ores produced by a temperature difference." This Seebeck effect became the basis of the thermocouple, which is still considered the most accurate measurement of temperature today. The converse Peltier effect was seen over a decade later when a current was run through a circuit with two dissimilar metals, resulting in a temperature difference between the metals.

In 1827 German scientist Georg Ohm expressed his law in his famous book Die galvanische Kette, mathematisch bearbeitet (The Galvanic Circuit Investigated Mathematically) in which he gave his complete theory of electricity.

In 1829 Antoine-César Becquerel developed the "constant current" cell, forerunner of the well-known Daniell cell. When this acid-alkali cell was monitored by a galvanometer, current was found to be constant for an hour, the first instance of "constant current". He applied the results of his study of thermoelectricity to the construction of an electric thermometer, and measured the temperatures of the interior of animals, of the soil at different depths, and of the atmosphere at different heights. He helped validate Faraday's laws and conducted extensive investigations on the electroplating of metals with applications for metal finishing and metallurgy. Solar cell technology dates to 1839 when Becquerel observed that shining light on an electrode submerged in a conductive solution would create an electric current.

Michael Faraday began, in 1832, what promised to be a rather tedious attempt to prove that all electricities had precisely the same properties and caused precisely the same effects. The key effect was electrochemical decomposition. Voltaic and electromagnetic electricity posed no problems, but static electricity did. As Faraday delved deeper into the problem, he made two startling discoveries. First, electrical force did not, as had long been supposed, act at a distance upon molecules to cause them to dissociate. It was the passage of electricity through a conducting liquid medium that caused the molecules to dissociate, even when the electricity merely discharged into the air and did not pass through a "pole" or "center of action" in a voltaic cell. Second, the amount of the decomposition was found to be related directly to the amount of electricity passing through the solution.

These findings led Faraday to a new theory of electrochemistry. The electric force, he argued, threw the molecules of a solution into a state of tension. When the force was strong enough to distort the forces that held the molecules together so as to permit the interaction with neighbouring particles, the tension was relieved by the migration of particles along the lines of tension, the different parts of atoms migrating in opposite directions. The amount of electricity that passed, then, was clearly related to the chemical affinities of the substances in solution. These experiments led directly to Faraday's two laws of electrochemistry which state:

- The amount of a substance deposited on each electrode of an electrolytic cell is directly proportional to the amount of electricity passing through the cell.
- The quantities of different elements deposited by a given amount of electricity are in the ratio of their chemical equivalent weights.

William Sturgeon built an electric motor in 1832 and invented the commutator, a ring of metal-bristled brushes which allow the spinning armature to maintain contact with the electric current and changed the alternating current to a pulsating direct current. He also improved the voltaic battery and worked on the theory of thermoelectricity.

Hippolyte Pixii, a French instrument maker, constructed the first dynamo in 1832 and later built a direct current dynamo using the commutator. This was the first practical mechanical generator of electric current that used concepts demonstrated by Faraday.

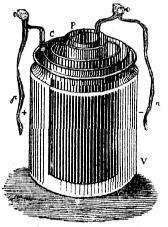
Daniell cell

John Daniell began experiments in 1835 in an attempt to improve the voltaic battery with its problems of being unsteady and a weak source of electric current. His experiments soon led to remarkable results. In 1836, he invented a primary cell in which hydrogen was eliminated in the generation of the electricity. Daniell had solved the problem of polarization. In his laboratory he had learned to alloy the amalgamated zinc of Sturgeon with mercury. His version was the first of the two-fluid class battery and the first battery that produced a constant reliable source of electric current over a long period of time.

William Grove produced the first fuel cell in 1839. He based his experiment on the fact that sending an electric current through water splits the water into its component parts of hydrogen and oxygen. So, Grove tried reversing the reaction—combining hydrogen and oxygen to produce electricity and water. Eventually the term fuel cell was coined in 1889 by Ludwig Mond and Charles Langer, who attempted to build the first practical device using air and industrial coal gas. He also introduced a powerful battery at the annual meeting of the British Association for the Advancement of Science in 1839. Grove's first cell consisted of zinc in diluted sulfuric acid and platinum in concentrated nitric acid, separated by a porous pot. The cell was able to generate about 12 amperes of current at about 1.8 volts. This cell had nearly double the voltage of the first Daniell cell. Grove's nitric acid cell was the favourite battery of the early American telegraph (1840–1860), because it offered strong current output.

As telegraphs became more complex, the need for a constant voltage became critical and the Grove device was limited (as the cell discharged, nitric acid was depleted and voltage was reduced). By the time of the American Civil War, Grove's battery had been replaced by the Daniell battery. In 1841 Robert Bunsen replaced the expensive platinum electrode used in Grove's battery with a carbon electrode. This led to large scale use of the "Bunsen battery" in the production of arc-lighting and in electroplating.

Wilhelm Weber developed, in 1846, the electrodynamometer, in which a current causes a coil suspended within another coil to turn when a current is passed through both. In 1852, Weber defined the absolute unit of electrical resistance (which was named the ohm after Georg Ohm). Weber's name is now used as a unit name to describe magnetic flux, the weber.

German physicist Johann Hittorf concluded that ion movement caused electric current. In 1853 Hittorf noticed that some ions traveled more rapidly than others. This observation led to the concept of transport number, the rate at which particular ions carried the electric current. Hittorf measured the changes in the concentration of electrolysed solutions, computed from these the transport numbers (relative carrying capacities) of many ions, and, in 1869, published his findings governing the migration of ions.

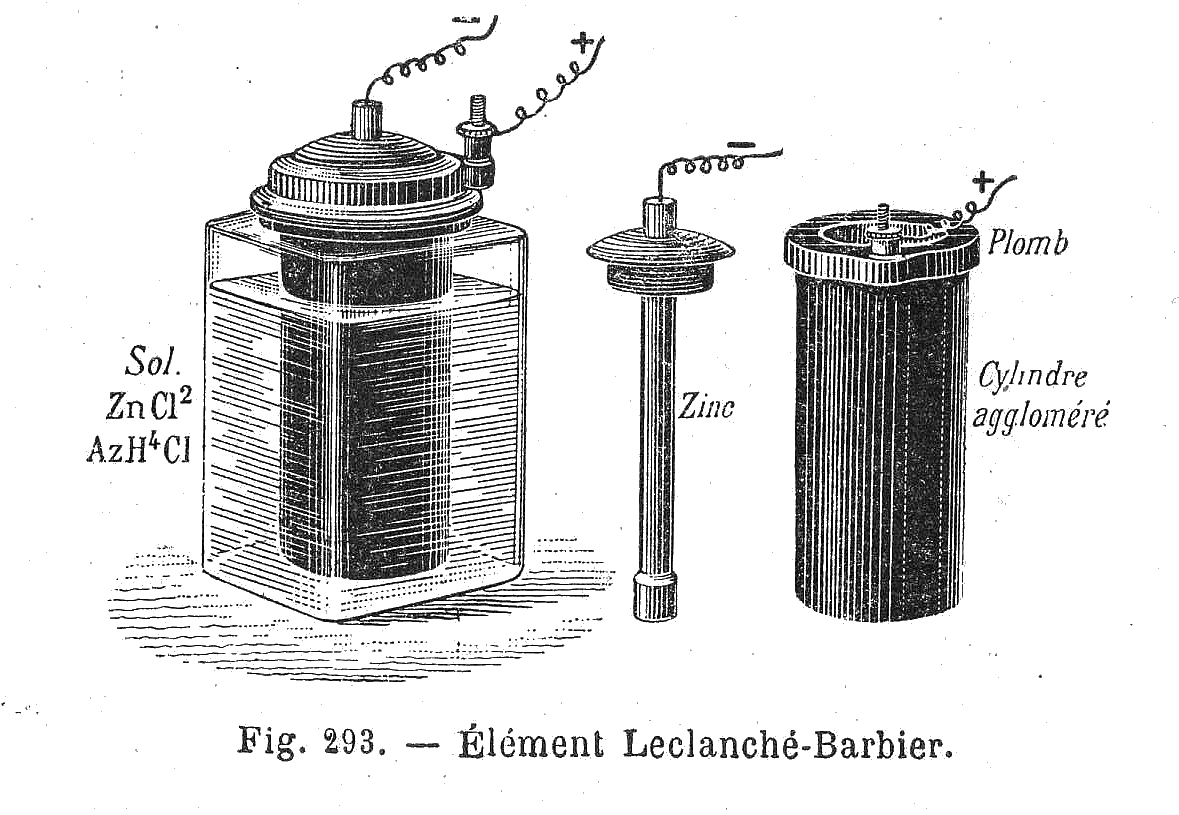
Leclanché cell

In 1866, Georges Leclanché patented a new battery system, which was immediately successful. Leclanché's original cell was assembled in a porous pot. The positive electrode (the cathode) consisted of crushed manganese dioxide with a little carbon mixed in. The negative pole (anode) was a zinc rod. The cathode was packed into the pot, and a carbon rod was inserted to act as a current collector. The anode and the pot were then immersed in an ammonium chloride solution. The liquid acted as the electrolyte, readily seeping through the porous pot and making contact with the cathode material. Leclanché's "wet" cell became the forerunner to the world's first widely used battery, the zinc-carbon cell.

== Late 19th century advances and the advent of electrochemical societies ==
In 1869 Zénobe Gramme devised his first clean direct current dynamo. His generator featured a ring armature wound with many individual coils of wire.

Svante August Arrhenius published his thesis in 1884, Recherches sur la conductibilité galvanique des électrolytes (Investigations on the galvanic conductivity of electrolytes). From the results of his experiments, the author concluded that electrolytes, when dissolved in water, become to varying degrees split or dissociated into positive and negative ions. The degree to which this dissociation occurred depended above all on the nature of the substance and its concentration in the solution, being more developed the greater the dilution. The ions were supposed to be the carriers of not only the electric current, as in electrolysis, but also of the chemical activity. The relation between the actual number of ions and their number at great dilution (when all the molecules were dissociated) gave a quantity of special interest ("activity constant").

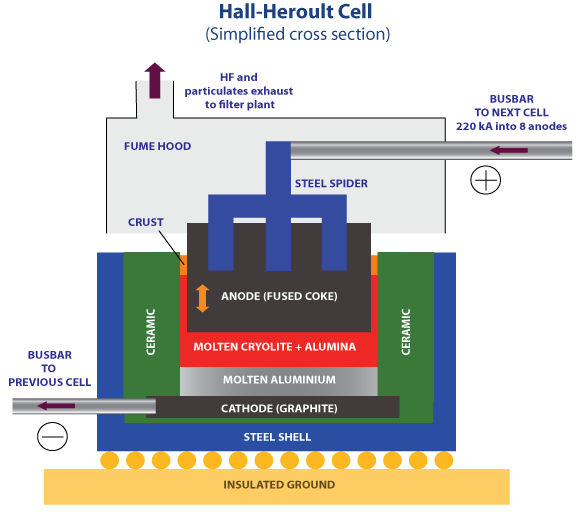
A Hall-Héroult industrial cell.

The race for the commercially viable production of aluminium was won in 1886 by Paul Héroult and Charles M. Hall. The problem many researchers had with extracting aluminium was that electrolysis of an aluminium salt dissolved in water yields aluminium hydroxide. Both Hall and Héroult avoided this problem by dissolving aluminium oxide in a new solvent— fused cryolite (Na_{3}AlF_{6}).

Wilhelm Ostwald, 1909 Nobel Laureate, started his experimental work in 1875, with an investigation on the law of mass action of water in relation to the problems of chemical affinity, with special emphasis on electrochemistry and chemical dynamics. In 1894 he gave the first modern definition of a catalyst and turned his attention to catalytic reactions. Ostwald is especially known for his contributions to the field of electrochemistry, including important studies of the electrical conductivity and electrolytic dissociation of organic acids.

Hermann Nernst developed the theory of the electromotive force of the voltaic cell in 1888. He developed methods for measuring dielectric constants and was the first to show that solvents of high dielectric constants promote the ionization of substances. Nernst's early studies in electrochemistry were inspired by Arrhenius' dissociation theory which first recognised the importance of ions in solution. In 1889, Nernst elucidated the theory of galvanic cells by assuming an "electrolytic pressure of dissolution," which forces ions from electrodes into solution and which was opposed to the osmotic pressure of the dissolved ions. He applied the principles of thermodynamics to the chemical reactions proceeding in a battery. In that same year he showed how the characteristics of the current produced could be used to calculate the free energy change in the chemical reaction producing the current. He constructed an equation, known as Nernst Equation, which describes the relation of a battery cell's voltage to its properties.

In 1898 Fritz Haber published his textbook, Electrochemistry: Grundriss der technischen Elektrochemie auf theoretischer Grundlage (The Theoretical Basis of Technical Electrochemistry), which was based on the lectures he gave at Karlsruhe. In the preface to his book he expressed his intention to relate chemical research to industrial processes and in the same year he reported the results of his work on electrolytic oxidation and reduction, in which he showed that definite reduction products can result if the voltage at the cathode is kept constant. In 1898 he explained the reduction of nitrobenzene in stages at the cathode and this became the model for other similar reduction processes.

In 1909, Robert Andrews Millikan began a series of experiments to determine the electric charge carried by a single electron. He began by measuring the course of charged water droplets in an electrical field. The results suggested that the charge on the droplets is a multiple of the elementary electric charge, but the experiment was not accurate enough to be convincing. He obtained more precise results in 1910 with his famous oil-drop experiment in which he replaced water (which tended to evaporate too quickly) with oil.

Jaroslav Heyrovský, a Nobel laureate, eliminated the tedious weighing required by previous analytical techniques, which used the differential precipitation of mercury by measuring drop-time. In the previous method, a voltage was applied to a dropping mercury electrode and a reference electrode was immersed in a test solution. After 50 drops of mercury were collected, they were dried and weighed. The applied voltage was varied and the experiment repeated. Measured weight was plotted versus applied voltage to obtain the curve. In 1921, Heyrovský had the idea of measuring the current flowing through the cell instead of just studying drop-time.

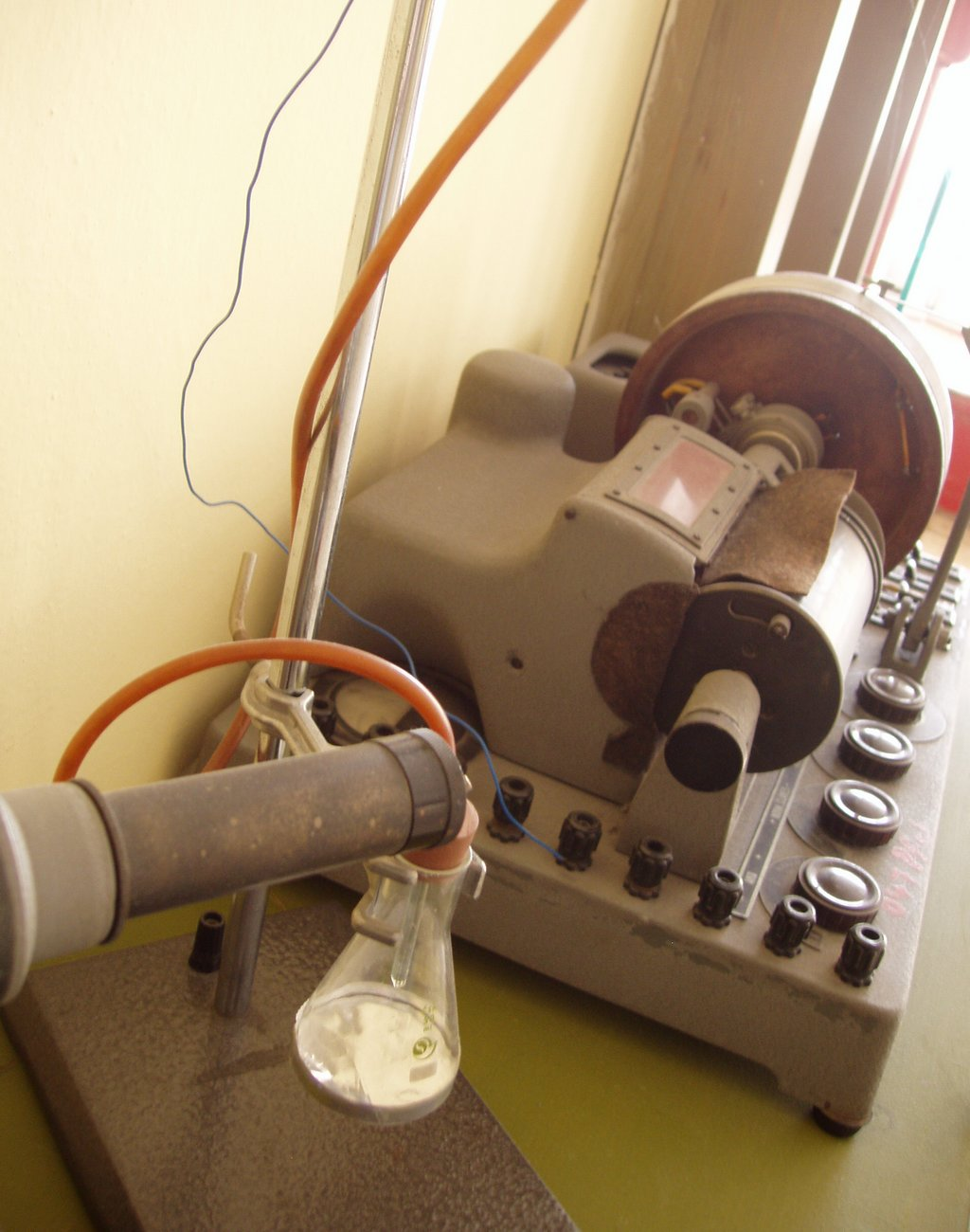
Heyrovský's Polarograph

On February 10, 1922, the "polarograph" was born as Heyrovský recorded the current-voltage curve for a solution of 1 mol/L NaOH. Heyrovský correctly interpreted the current increase between −1.9 and −2.0 V as being due to the deposit of Na^{+} ions, forming an amalgam. Shortly thereafter, with his Japanese colleague Masuzo Shikata, he constructed the first instrument for the automatic recording of polarographic curves, which became world-famous later as the polarograph.

In 1923, Johannes Nicolaus Brønsted and Thomas Martin Lowry published essentially the same theory about how acids and bases behave using electrochemical basis.

The International Society of Electrochemistry (ISE) was founded in 1949, and some years later the first sophisticated electrophoretic apparatus was developed in 1937 by Arne Tiselius, who was awarded the 1948 Nobel prize for his work in protein electrophoresis. He developed the "moving boundary," which later would become known as zone electrophoresis, and used it to separate serum proteins in solution. Electrophoresis became widely developed in the 1940s and 1950s when the technique was applied to molecules ranging from the largest proteins to amino acids and even inorganic ions.

During the 1960s and 1970s quantum electrochemistry was developed by Revaz Dogonadze and his pupils.

== Time of electromagnetic and classical opties ==
- Electrochemistry
- History of the battery
- Karpen Pile
