= Andrzej Wieckowski =

American chemistry professor (1945–2019)

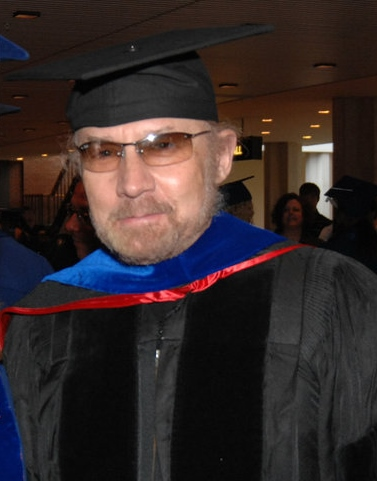
- Wieckowski, UIUC Graduation Ceremony, August 2010
- Born: February 22, 1945; Łódź, Poland
- Died: January 31, 2019 (aged 73); Eugene, Oregon, United States
- Education: University of Warsaw (D.Sc.) (1981); University of Warsaw (Ph.D.) (1973); University of Warsaw (M.S.) (1968)
- Known for: Electrochemistry; Surface science Spectroscopy; Electrocatalysis; Fuel cells
- Awards: US DoE Prize (1992); ISE Jacques Tacussel Prize (1998); ECS David C. Graham Award (2003); ECS Fellow (2007); ISE Gold Medal (2006/2007); ISE Fellow (2009)
- Scientific career
- Fields: Chemistry
- Workplaces: University of Illinois at Urbana–Champaign; University of California at Santa Barbara
- Doctoral advisor: Jerzy Sobkowski

Andrzej Wieckowski (Polish: Andrzej Więckowski, February 22, 1945 – January 31, 2019) was an Emeritus Professor of Chemistry at the University of Illinois at Urbana–Champaign and the North American Editor of Electrochimica Acta. He is known for his spectroscopic investigations of electrocatalysis in fuel cells and co-inventing of the direct formic acid fuel cell (DFAFC). He authored more than 300 publications, has been cited over 13,000 times and has an h-index 60. He was appointed fellow of the Electrochemical Society in 2007 and fellow of the International Society of Electrochemistry in 2009. He was awarded the US Department of Energy Prize for outstanding Scientific Accomplishment in Materials Chemistry in 1992, the ISE Jacques Tacussel Prize in 1998, the ECS David. C. Graham Award in 2003, and the ISE Gold Medal in 2007.

== Career ==
Andrzej Wieckowski earned his Ph.D. in chemistry in 1973 and his D.Sc. (habilitation) in 1981 from the University of Warsaw, Poland. Over that time, he published over thirty publications mostly focusing on electrochemical and radiochemical investigations of the structure and reactivity of small molecules, such as carbon dioxide, formic acid or methanol, at metal surfaces. From 1981 to 1982, Andrzej Wieckowski was a visiting professor at Laval University in Quebec, Canada. In 1982–1985, he was a Visiting Postdoctoral Scientist in Arthur Hubbard's laboratory at the University of California at Santa Barbara, studying new characterization methods of surface science. In 1985, Andrzej Wieckowski joined the University of Illinois at Urbana–Champaign as an assistant professor and became a full professor in the department of chemistry in 1996 until his retirement in 2012. From 1990 to 2005, he was also a principal investigator at the Frederic Seitz Materials Research Laboratory at UIUC. In 2002, he became the North American editor of Electrochimica Acta.

== Research ==
Andrzej Wieckowski's research was focused on the development and use of spectroscopic methods to characterize the surface structure of electrocatalysts, including fuel cell catalysts, and on the understanding surface oxidation and reduction processes at a molecular level. In collaboration with Eric Oldfield, Wieckowski pioneered the development of electrochemical NMR spectroscopy (EC-NMR), combining metal/surface NMR and electrochemistry to study electrochemical interfaces. Other notable spectroscopic methods developed and used in his research group included BB-SFG (broad band-sum-frequency generation), CL-EELS (cathodoluminescence – electron energy loss spectroscopy) in UHV (ultra-high vacuum) for electrochemistry and EC-XPS (electrochemical X-ray photoelectron spectroscopy). Andrzej Wieckowski was also the co-inventor of the direct formic acid fuel cell (DFAFC).

== Personal life ==
In 1980, Andrzej Wieckowski assumed a leadership role in Solidarity at the University of Warsaw, a Polish non-governmental trade union, which over time evolved to become non-violent anti-communist social movement, generally viewed today as having greatly contributed to the fall of communism in Central and Eastern Europe in 1989–1990. He died on January 31, 2019, in Oregon, where he had retired.

== Major publications ==
- Chemical and Electronic Effects of Ni in Pt/Ni and Pt/Ru/Ni Alloy Nanoparticles in Methanol Electrooxidation, K.-W. Park, J.-H. Choi, B.-K. Kwon, S.-A. Lee, Y.-E. Sung, H.-Y. Ha, S.-A. Hong, H. Kim, A. Wieckowski, Journal of Physical Chemistry B, 2002, 106, 1869–1877.
- Direct formic acid fuel cells, C. Rice, S. Ha, R. I. Masel, P. Waszczuk, A. Wieckowski, T. Barnard, Journal of Power Sources, 2002. 111 (1), 83–89.
- Electrocatalysis of oxygen reduction and small alcohol oxidation in alkaline media, J. S. Spendelow and A. Wieckowski, Physical Chemistry Chemical Physics, 2007. 9 (21), 2654–2675.
- Catalysts for direct formic acid fuel cells, C. Rice, S. Ha, R. I. Masel, A. Wieckowski, Journal of Power Sources, 2003. 115 (2), 229–235.
- Electrochemistry of Methanol at Low Index Crystal Planes of Platinum: An Integrated Voltammetric and Chronoamperometric Study, E. Herrero, K. Franaszczuk, A. Wieckowski, Journal of Physical Chemistry, 1994. 98 (19), 5074–83.
