= National Cold Fusion Institute =

Defunct American nonprofit research institute

- Abbreviation: NCFI
- Formation: August 7, 1989; 36 years ago
- Founder: Government of Utah
- Dissolved: June 30, 1991; 34 years ago
- Type: Nonprofit research institute
- Legal status: Defunct
- Purpose: To research cold fusion
- Headquarters: 390 Wakara Way, University of Utah Research Park
- Location: Salt Lake City, Utah, United States
- Director: Hugo Rossi (first); Fritz Will (last)
- Board of directors: James Brophy, Ian Cumming, Chase N. Peterson, and Fritz Will (1991)
- Key people: Martin Fleischmann; Stanley Pons
- Main organ: Board of trustees
- Affiliations: University of Utah

The National Cold Fusion Institute (NCFI) was a nonprofit research institute affiliated with the University of Utah in Salt Lake City, Utah, United States. It was established in 1989 to research cold fusion, a phenomenon that chemists Martin Fleischmann and Stanley Pons claimed to have achieved earlier in the year. It closed in 1991.

In March 1989, Fleischmann and Pons announced that they had achieved nuclear fusion during an experiment using two electrodes made of palladium submerged in heavy water. While other researchers initially reported that similar experiments had resulted in some evidence of nuclear fusion, these results were subsequently withdrawn due to various errors, and in subsequent studies, researchers were largely critical of Fleischmann's and Pons's findings. However, in April 1989, the government of Utah voted to allocate $4.5 million (equivalent to $11.7 million in 2025) to establish and operate a research institute to investigate the proposed phenomenon.

The institute was officially established on August 7 at a facility in the University of Utah Research Park, with Hugo Rossi serving as its first director. Rossi resigned in November 1989, later stating that his resignation was due in part to difficulties in garnering collaboration between the researchers, with particular criticism towards Pons. In 1990, the institute was the subject of controversy when an anonymous financial donation to the institute was revealed by university president Chase N. Peterson to have been from the university itself. In the later half of that year, the institute was subject to a financial audit by the Utah State Auditor's office and a scientific review by an independent panel of researchers, with the latter reporting that there was no evidence that nuclear fusion had occurred as part of the institute's experiments. In June 1991, the institute closed, having exhausted its initial funding and having failed to garner significant private funding.

While the university continued to pay attorneys to pursue several patent applications regarding cold fusion, no patent applications were ever granted. Fleischmann and Pons continued research into cold fusion in France, though without success. In 2022, The Salt Lake Tribune reported that the institute had failed to verify Fleischmann's and Pons's findings during its existence.

== Background ==
On March 23, 1989, Martin Fleischmann and Stanley Pons, two chemists who were working at the University of Utah in Salt Lake City, Utah, announced that they had produced a nuclear fusion reaction in a process that became known as cold fusion. The two said that they had conducted an experiment where an electric current was passed between two electrodes made of palladium submerged in heavy water which had produced a large amount of heat that they attributed to fusion of the atomic nuclei of the deuterium present in the water.

By early April, researchers at several American universities, including the Georgia Institute of Technology, Texas A&M University, and the University of Washington, reported that similar experiments had resulted in some evidence of nuclear fusion having occurred. However, these reports were all subsequently withdrawn after various errors in the experiments were discovered. Further research at numerous institutes and universities was unable to demonstrate that fusion was occurring. On May 1, the American Physical Society held a meeting where cold fusion was largely dismissed, and on November 12, a committee of the United States Department of Energy concluded that cold fusion was unproven and did not merit further research.

Fleischmann's and Pon's results were also criticized by other researchers. In November 1989, researchers from the Harwell Laboratory published a report in the scientific journal Nature where they said they were unable to replicate Fleischmann's and Pon's results and speculated that the two's claims may have been the result of errors in their experimentation. Furthermore, in January 1991, scientist Frank Close wrote in New Scientist that, "my own researches during the past 18 months show that some of the so-called evidence for fusion was not obtained and presented to the world in the accepted scientific way". Additionally, scientists working for General Electric published a paper in 1992 that said that the two had misinterpreted the data they had collected from their experiments.

== Establishment ==
On March 24, 1989—the day after Fleischmann and Pons made their initial announcements concerning cold fusion—Utah Governor Norman H. Bangerter announced a special session of the Utah State Legislature in order to discuss state funding for cold fusion research. On April 7, the legislature passed legislation to allocate $5 million in funding towards cold fusion. Of this amount, $4.5 million (equivalent to $11.7 million in 2025) would go towards the establishment and operation of a research organization, while $500,000 ($1.3 million in 2025) would go towards paying patent attorneys. Ultimately, the government of Utah established the National Cold Fusion Institute (NCFI), a nonprofit research institute, which officially opened on August 7, 1989.

The organization would be affiliated with the university, which was also operated by the state government, and based in the University of Utah Research Park. For this location, the university signed a five-year lease for $1.1 million ($2.9 million in 2025). In addition to the state funding, the institute was hopeful that additional private funding could be secured in the future, and the institute also lobbied the United States Congress for $25 million ($65 million in 2025) in federal funding. According to the Deseret News, at the time, the institute was only one of two instances of funding being allocated for cold fusion research, alongside funding allocated to several universities by the Electric Power Research Institute (EPRI). Prior to the institute's establishment, the university acquired the rights to use the term "cold fusion" from Jim Bradley, a politician who had previously served as the head of the state's Department of Energy and had registered the term as a business name. Bradley had registered the term with the state's Department of Commerce on April 5 for $20 ($52 in 2025) and sold the rights to use the term to the university for $2,000 ($5,200 in 2025).

The institute's funding appropriations would be overseen by the Fusion/Energy Advisory Council, which would consist of members appointed by the state government. Raymond L. Hixson served as the council's chairman, being appointed to that position by Governor Bangerter roughly two weeks after Fleischmann's and Pons's initial announcements. Hugo Rossi, the dean of the University of Utah College of Science, served as the institute's first director. Concerning the composition of the institute's board of trustees, university officials said that they hoped to appoint several businessman alongside academics, with Ian Cumming, James C. Fletcher, and Jon Huntsman Sr. mentioned by the Deseret News as possible candidates. Initially, Pons served only as an advisor for the institute and continued his own research into cold fusion independently. In October, both Fleischmann and Pons joined the NCFI with the condition that their work would be peer reviewed by other members of the institute.

== Research and early controversies ==
=== Early activities ===
In late September 1989, Rossi said that none of the experiments conducted by the institute up to that time had yielded results that would indicate a nuclear fusion reaction was taking place, such as the production of excess heat, neutrons, or tritium. Rossi initially stated that the institute may close if no results were found by February 1990, though he later said that the institute had no deadline for finding results. On October 1, the institute announced that its facilities would be off-limits to reporters and that university officials James Brophy and Pam Fogle would serve as the official spokespeople for the institute and issue occasional press releases. Around the same time, the Westinghouse Electric Corporation publicly announced that they would not be moving forward with requests from the institute to help fund cold fusion research. Later that month, Brophy stated that he was confident that the institute would attract between 10 and 20 private investors by the end of the fiscal year.

In November, a panel of 22 scientists from the United States Department of Energy's Energy Research Advisory Board presented a report advising against the allocation of the $25 million in federal funding that the institute had requested. The panel, headed by John R. Huizenga, had been studying cold fusion since May and reported that it had found no concrete evidence of fusion reactions in any of the dozens of experiments that had been conducted throughout the United States. Also in November, Rossi resigned as director after four months in the position. Speaking to New Scientist in June 1990, he said, "Part of the reason for quitting was the inability to get the personnel there to collaborate", further stating that Pons refused to share data with other scientists on several occasions. The following month, Fritz Will, a research scientist from General Electric, was appointed the new director of the institute. In the interim, Brophy served as the institute's acting director.

In late March 1990, around the anniversary of Fleischmann's and Pon's initial announcement, the institute held its first annual conference in Salt Lake City to discuss the state of cold fusion research, which was attended by about 200 people. Forty people presented papers at the conference. Around the same time, a team of researchers led by Michael Salaman of the University of Utah published a paper in Nature that included the results of studies they had conducted on the apparatus used by Pons where they claimed that they had found no evidence of cold fusion. Pons responded that one of the cells used in his experiments had produced excess heat for two hours, but that it had occurred during a power failure when the team's detectors were not working. At the time, Will said that researchers at the institute were attempting to optimize an apparatus that he said was producing excess heat.

=== Legal and funding issues ===
In April 1990, C. Gary Triggs, an attorney representing Fleischmann and Pons, called on Salaman to retract the Nature paper, writing in a letter, "Please be advised that any damages suffered by my clients proximately caused by any act or omission on the part of yourself or any other coauthor of the subject paper will not be tolerated. I have been instructed by my clients to take such legal action as is deemed appropriate to protect their interests in this matter." Salaman criticized the act and said that Chase N. Peterson, the president of the University of Utah, had instructed him to "lie low". Additionally, Salaman said that the university had told him that it would refuse to indemnify him in the case of a lawsuit, though Joseph L. Taylor, the university's vice president of academic affairs, later told him that the state government would defend him for lawsuits filed over his work. In a later article by New Scientist, Salaman noted that, at the time, Triggs had been paid $68,000 ($168,000 in 2025) by the university as a consultant for patents on cold fusion. The American Physical Society stated that they would discuss the matter at their next executive meeting, with society member Robert L. Park saying that some members were offering to contribute to a legal defense fund for Salaman. Triggs later apologized for the letter.

In early 1990, Peterson announced that an anonymous donor had made a donation of $500,000 ($1.2 million in 2025) to the institute. On May 31, Peterson stated that the donor had actually been the university itself. The revelation was a surprise to the Fusion/Energy Advisory Council, whose members had believed that the donation had been evidence that the institute was succeeding in generating outside interest from investors. Following the disclosure, Will declined the donation. Per Rossi, who at the time was the dean of the College of Science, the donation was "an attempt" by the president "to bring less controversy to the institute". On June 1, 22 members of the College of Science held a meeting to discuss the incident, with the members informing Peterson that they would be forming a panel to investigate the research that the institute had conducted to date. By that time the institute had spent roughly $2.5 million ($6.2 million in 2025) of its funding. On June 1, the Deseret News reported that Peterson would retire at the end of the 1990–1991 academic year. Several days later, on June 4, the university's faculty senate voted to ask the Utah Board of Higher Education to investigate Peterson over his competency for the position of president. Also in early June, the EPRI, which had announced interest in signing a contract that would have bestowed the NCFI with a grant of $160,000 ($394,000 in 2025), opted against entering into a relationship with the NCFI.

== Financial audit and scientific review ==
In June 1990, the Fusion/Energy Advisory Council announced that, at the behest of faculty members from the College of Science, they would be initiating both a financial audit and scientific review of the institute. In late October, the Utah State Auditor's office completed their financial audit of the NCFI. Tom Allen, the state auditor, said that they had made several recommendations to the institute in a letter sent to Will on October 24. He also stated that the university would have about two weeks to respond to the recommendations before the audit would be made public. Ultimately, the audit found several violations of the university's standard procedures, but no "material weaknesses" in the institute's financial handlings. By the end of October, The Salt Lake Tribune reported that the institute had received $40,000 ($99,000 in 2025) in private funding.

The state's Fusion/Energy Advisory Council stated in October that they would hold their scientific review of the institute on November 7. By this time, only $1.3 million ($3.2 million in 2025) remained from the initial $5 million ($13 million in 2025) that had been allocated for the institute and patent attorneys. Over the previous fiscal year, $2.1 million ($5.2 million in 2025) in state funding had been allocated to cold fusion research, with Fleischmann and Pons having spent $1 million ($2.5 million in 2025) of those funds. Pons later stated that he and Fleischmann had only spent $325,000 ($801,000 in 2025) of NCFI funds on research, a figure Will refuted. However, neither man had published a scientific paper on their research or shared their research results with other institute members. Both Will and council members expressed disappointment over the two's lack of cooperation, with Karen Morse—provost at Utah State University and one of the two scientists on the council—saying, "In essence, we've coddled them, quite frankly". By late October, it was uncertain whether the two men would cooperate with the review.

On October 25, Will and several researchers, excluding Fleischmann and Pons, attended a meeting with the council where they presented summaries of their results. The researchers noted that in several experiments they had observed tritium levels that were slightly higher than background levels. However, Douglas Morrison, a physicist from CERN who was present at the review, noted that the amounts were too small to indicate that fusion had occurred.

On November 7, a panel of four scientists—Robert Adair, a Sterling Professor of physics at Yale University; Stanley Bruckenstein, a chemistry professor at the State University of New York at Buffalo; Loren G. Helper, a chemistry and chemical engineering professor at the University of Alberta; and Dale F. Stein, a materials scientist and president of Michigan Technological University—met with NCFI researchers, including Pons, to begin their review, which they were planning to publicly release in early January 1991. Despite the fact that the panel members had signed confidentiality agreements, Fleischmann and Pons, citing advice from a patent attorney, did not fully disclose their research to the panel. The panel ultimately concluded that, while the research seemed solid, they had been unable to find evidence that nuclear fusion had occurred in the researchers' experiments. Following the release of the independent panel's review, the council decided to initiate a review of Fleischmann's and Pons's experiments, which would be overseen by council member and Utah State University professor Wilford Hansen. According to The Salt Lake Tribune, an agreement had to be reached between university officials and the two researchers to have them turn over their research data to Hansen for review.

In November, The Salt Lake Tribune reported that the institute had raised less than $100,000 ($246,000 in 2025) in private funding. Will stated at the time that the institute was in discussions regarding private donations of over $4 million ($9.9 million in 2025).

== Later developments and closure ==
By January 1991, the institute had used the majority of its funding. By that time, the interest in cold fusion from the scientific community had significantly diminished by that time, with the Deseret News reporting that other researchers had consistently failed to reproduce the findings initially announced by Fleischmann and Pons in March 1989. That same month, Will announced a reorganization of the institute whereby Pons—who had resigned from a tenured position at the university and accepted a research professor position—and a team of researchers would be split from the institute and allowed to report directly to the university's Office of Research. Per Will, the new organization would allow Fleischmann and Pons to "continue work free of the constraints that they evidently hate. ... Pons and Fleischmann are not team players. I do not know myself what the reasons for these attitudes are."

By January 9, The Salt Lake Tribune reported that the legal funding that had been allocated by the state government had been exhausted, with Joseph Tesch—the state's assistant attorney general who oversaw cold fusion legal work—stating that they would need additional annual funding of between $200,000 and $250,000 ($473,000 and $591,000 in 2025) to defend the nine patent applications that had been submitted. Additionally, Tesch recommended that the state would limit the amount of legal work conducted until after a review of Fleischmann's and Pons's experiments had been concluded so that "we have a better handle on what the patents are worth". Several state legislators expressed interest in continuing to fund cold fusion research but expressed skepticism because Governor Bangerter had not included any funds in his most recent budget proposal.

In early March, Will submitted his resignation from the institute's board of trustees, citing Fleischmann's and Pons's refusal to cooperate with a review of their research as his reason. At the time, the board consisted of Will, Brophy, Cumming, and Peterson. Will also said that he expected to step down as the institute's director on June 30—the expected closure date for the institute—unless more funds were obtained. By the following month, The Salt Lake Tribune reported that the institute's closure by the end of June was "considered a foregone conclusion" by the council. On June 13, Brophy said in a press conference that the institute was expected to close in two weeks. Concerning the aftermath, the university planned to have Will become a chemical engineering research professor. Additionally, as the university held a long-term lease on the institute's property, researchers would continue to work at the location. Meanwhile, equipment used by the institute would be transferred to other departments within the university.

The institute closed by the end of June, having failed to garner substantial outside funding to continue its operations. The following month, former researchers for the NCFI published a three-volume technical report of their research, wherein they said that they had found signatures of nuclear fusion in their experiments. Writing about the institute in 2022, Tim Fitzpatrick of The Salt Lake Tribune reported that the institute had failed to reproduce the findings initially reported by Fleischmann and Pons in March 1989. At the time of the institute's closure, Chemical & Engineering News reported that cold fusion had been largely rejected by the scientific community. However, discussions on and research into cold fusion continued following the institute's closure.

== Aftermath ==
In September 1991, Hixson spoke at a conference held at the University of Utah where he discussed the institute, saying that while there had been issues, it was ultimately worth the investment by the state because of the possible money to be gained by the patents that had been submitted. The following month, the Deseret News published statements from Fleischmann and Pons regarding the institute. The two pushed back against criticism that they were uncooperative with the institute and said that they had been opposed to the establishment of the institute from the beginning, instead wanting the $5 million in state funding for patent defense and research grants. Following the institute's closure, the two moved to France to continue researching cold fusion with funding from Toyota, though this project ended in 1998 without success.

On January 2, 1992, Andrew Riley, a former researcher who had worked at the NCFI, was killed during a cold fusion experiment he was conducting at SRI International in Menlo Park, California. According to The Salt Lake Tribune, he suffered fatal head injuries when a cell exploded, which had also injured several other researchers. The newspaper called Riley "cold fusion's only fatality", though specified that there was no evidence that the explosion was nuclear in nature.

In May 1992, it was reported that the university planned to use a loan obtained by borrowing against its financial endowment to continue to pay patent attorneys working on cold fusion patent applications. On July 1 of that year, Pons reached out to the university with an offer to take over the patent applications that had been filed on his work, though this ultimately did not come to fruition. In 2004, The Salt Lake Tribune reported that the institute's patent claims had been transferred to a private organization, but that no patents had been granted by that time. In 2022, the newspaper reported that no patents on cold fusion had been granted.

== Sources ==
- Huizenga, John R. (1992). Cold Fusion: The Scientific Fiasco of the Century. Rochester, New York: University of Rochester Press. ISBN 978-1-878822-07-9. OCLC 25094798.
- Simon, Bart (2002). Undead Science: Science Studies and the Afterlife of Cold Fusion. New Brunswick, New Jersey: Rutgers University Press. ISBN 978-0-8135-3153-3. LCCN 2002023701. OCLC 49284126.
- Taubes, Gary (1993). Bad Science: The Short Life and Weird Times of Cold Fusion. New York City: Random House. ISBN 978-0-394-58456-0. OCLC 26811416.
