= Scanning electrochemical microscopy =

Technique of scanning probe microscopy

Scanning electrochemical microscopy (SECM) is a technique within the broader class of scanning probe microscopy (SPM) that is used to measure the local electrochemical behavior of liquid/solid, liquid/gas and liquid/liquid interfaces. Initial characterization of the technique was credited to University of Texas electrochemist, Allen J. Bard, in 1989. Since then, the theoretical underpinnings have matured to allow widespread use of the technique in chemistry, biology and materials science. Spatially resolved electrochemical signals can be acquired by measuring the current at an ultramicroelectrode (UME) tip as a function of precise tip position over a substrate region of interest. Interpretation of the SECM signal is based on the concept of diffusion-limited current. Two-dimensional raster scan information can be compiled to generate images of surface reactivity and chemical kinetics.

The technique is complementary to other surface characterization methods such as surface plasmon resonance (SPR), electrochemical scanning tunneling microscopy (ESTM), and atomic force microscopy (AFM) in the interrogation of various interfacial phenomena. In addition to yielding topographic information, SECM is often used to probe the surface reactivity of solid-state materials, electrocatalyst materials, enzymes and other biophysical systems. SECM and variations of the technique have also found use in microfabrication, surface patterning, and microstructuring.

== History ==
The emergence of ultramicroelectrodes (UMEs) around 1980 was pivotal to the development of sensitive electroanalytical techniques like SECM. UMEs employed as probes enabled the study of quick or localized electrochemical reactions. The first SECM-like experiment was performed in 1986 by Engstrom to yield direct observation of reaction profiles and short-lived intermediates. Simultaneous experiments by Allen J. Bard using an Electrochemical Scanning Tunneling Microscope (ESTM) demonstrated current at large tip-to-sample distances that was inconsistent with electron tunneling. This phenomenon was attributed to Faradaic current, compelling a more thorough analysis of electrochemical microscopy. The theoretical basis was presented in 1989 by Bard, where he also coined the term Scanning Electrochemical Microscopy. In addition to the simple collection modes used at the time, Bard illustrated the widespread utility of SECM through the implementation of various feedback modes. As the theoretical foundation developed, annual SECM-related publications steadily rose from 10 to around 80 in 1999, when the first commercial SECM became available. SECM continues to increase in popularity due to theoretical and technological advances that expand experimental modes while broadening substrate scope and enhancing sensitivity.

== Principles of operation ==
Electric potential is manipulated through the UME tip in a bulk solution containing a redox-active couple (e.g. Fe^{2+}/Fe^{3+}). When a sufficiently negative potential is applied, (Fe^{3+}) is reduced to (Fe^{2+}) at the UME tip, generating a diffusion-limited current. The steady-state current is governed by the flux of oxidized species in solution to the UME disc and is given by:

$i_{T, \infty} = 4nFCDa$

where i_{T,∞} is the diffusion-limited current, n is the number of electrons transferred at the electrode tip (O + ne^{−} → R), F is Faraday's constant, C is the concentration of the oxidized species in solution, D is the diffusion coefficient and a is the radius of the UME disc. In order to probe a surface of interest, the tip is moved closer to the surface and changes in current are measured.

There are two predominant modes of operation, which are feedback mode and collection-generation mode.

=== Feedback mode ===
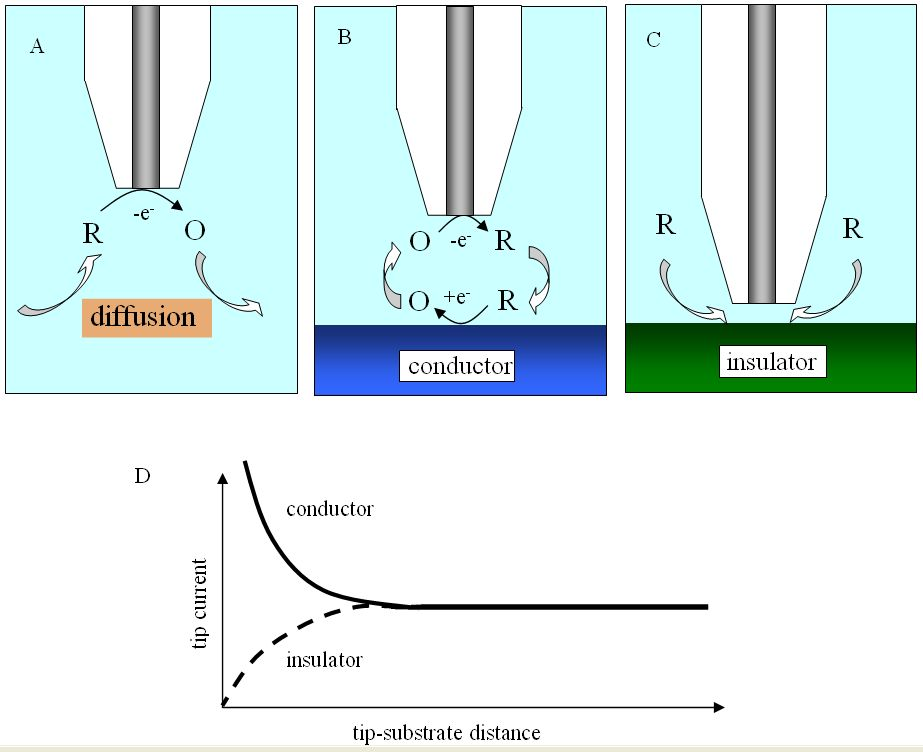
Feedback mode and approach curve

In a bulk solution, the oxidized species is reduced at the tip, producing a steady-state current that is limited by hemispherical diffusion. As the tip approaches a conductive substrate in the solution, the reduced species formed at the tip is oxidized at the conductive surface, yielding an increase in the tip current and creating a regenerative "positive" feedback loop. The opposite effect is observed when probing insulating surfaces, as the oxidized species cannot be regenerated and diffusion to the electrode is inhibited as a result of physical obstruction as the tip approaches the substrate, creating a "negative" feedback loop and decreasing the tip current. An additional parameter to consider when probing insulating surfaces is the electrode sheath diameter, r_{g}, since it contributes to the physical obstruction of diffusion.

The change in tip current as a function of distance d can be plotted as an "approach curve" as shown.

Due to the rate dependent nature of SECM measurements, it is also employed to study electron-transfer kinetics.

=== Collection-generation modes ===
Another mode of operation that is employed is tip generation/substrate collection (TG/SC). In TG/SC mode, the tip is held at a potential sufficient for an electrode reaction to occur and "generate" a product while the substrate is held at a potential sufficient for the electrode product to react with or be "collected" by the substrate. The reciprocal to this method is substrate generation/tip collection (SG/TC), where the substrate acts to generate a species that is measured at the tip. Both TG/SC and SG/TC variations are also categorized as "direct" modes.

Two currents are generated: the tip current, i_{T}, and the substrate current, i_{S}. Since the substrate is generally much larger than the tip, the efficiency of collection, i_{S}/i_{T}, is 1 if no reactions occur during the transfer of tip-generated species to the substrate. As the distance between tip and substrate, d, decreases, the collection efficiency, i_{S}/i_{T}, approaches 1.

=== Alternating Current (ac)-SECM ===
In ac-SECM a sinusoidal bias is applied to the dc bias of the SECM probe allowing the impedance of a sample to be measured, as is the case in electrochemical impedance spectroscopy. Unlike dc-SECM techniques ac-SECM does not require the use of a redox mediator. This is particularly advantageous for measurements where the redox mediator could affect the chemistry of the system under study. Examples include corrosion studies where a redox mediator may act to inhibit or enhance the rate of corrosion, and biological studies where a redox mediator may be toxic to the living cell under study.

In ac-SECM the feedback response measured is dependent on both the sample type and the experimental conditions. When a sample is insulating the measured impedance will always increase with decreasing probe to sample distance. This is not the case for a conductive sample however. For a conductive sample measured in a high conductivity electrolyte, or measured with a low ac frequency, decreasing the probe to sample distance will lead to an increase in impedance. If, however, a conductive sample is measured in a low conductivity electrolyte, or with a high ac frequency, decreasing the probe to sample distance will result in a lower measured impedance.

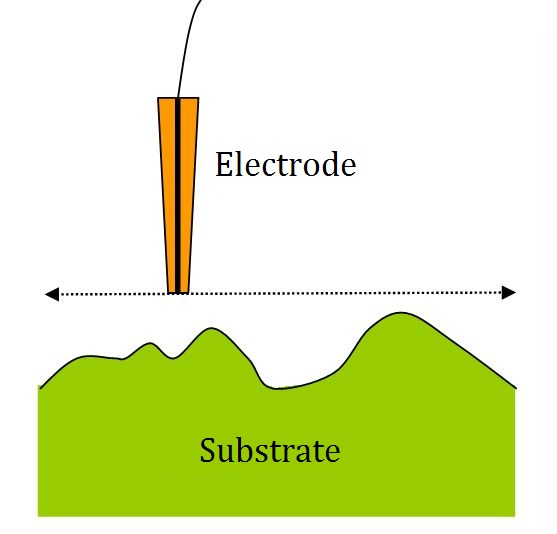
SECM Electrode scanning in constant-height mode

=== SECM imaging ===
Changes in current as a function of distance between electrode tip and substrate surface allow imaging of insulating and conducting surfaces for topology and reactivity information by moving the tip across surfaces and measuring tip current.

The most common scanning mode is constant-height mode, where the tip height is unchanging and is scanned across the surface in the x-y plane. Alternatively, constant distance measurements are possible, which change the z position to maintain the probe to sample distance as the probe is scanned across the surface in the x-y plane. The constant distance measurement can be based on an electrical signal as is the case in the constant-current mode, where the device attempts to maintain a constant current by changing the substrate to tip distance, d, and recording the change in d. A mechanical signal can also be used to control the probe to sample distance. Examples of this are the intermittent contact (ic)-SECM and shear force techniques which use changes in probe vibration to maintain the probe to sample distance.

Spatial resolution is dependent on the tip radius, the substrate to tip distance, the precision of the electronics, and other considerations.

== Instrumentation ==
Schematic of the fundamental devices involved in most SECM experiments. Experimental control is exercised through manipulation of the piezo controller and potential programmer, while data is collected through the bipotentiostat.

Early SECMs were constructed solely by individual lab groups from a set of common components including potentiostat (or bipotentiostat) and potential programmer, current amplifier, piezoelectric positioner and controller, computer, and UME. Many SECM experiments are highly specific in nature, and in-house assembly of SECMs remains common. The development of new techniques toward the reliable nanofabrication of electrodes has been a primary focus in the literature due to several distinct advantages including high mass-transfer rates and low levels of reactant adsorption in kinetic experiments. Additionally, enhanced spatial resolution afforded by reduced tip size expands the scope of SECM studies to smaller and faster phenomena. The following methods encompass an abbreviated summary of fabrication techniques in a rapidly developing field.

=== Preparation of electrodes ===
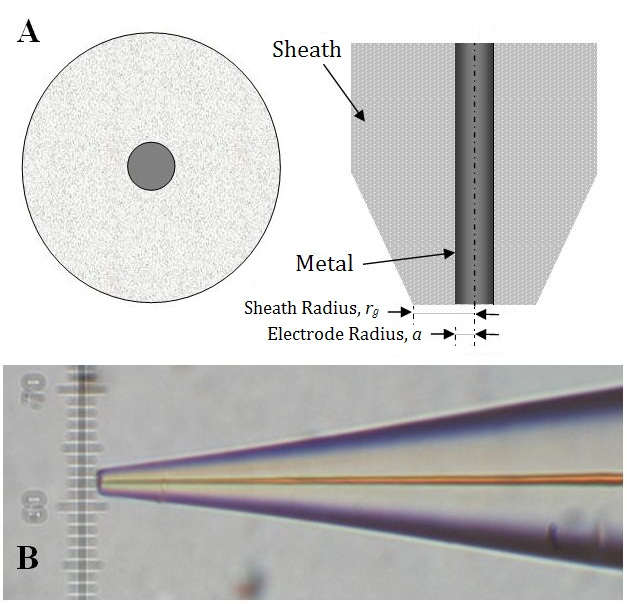
(A) Schematics of an ultramicroelectrode. The exposed metal is the active part of the electrode. (B) Optical micrograph of a tip. The platinum wire (orange) is sealed inside a glass sheath.

SECM probes use platinum as the active core material, however carbon, gold, mercury, and silver have all been used. Typical preparation of a microscale electrode is performed by heat sealing a microwire or carbon fiber in a glass capillary under vacuum. This tip can be connected to a larger copper electrode through the use of silver epoxy then polished to yield a sharpened tip. Nanofabrication of electrodes can be performed by etching a metal wire with sodium cyanide and sodium hydroxide. Etched metal wires can then be coated with wax, varnish, molten paraffin or glass, poly(a-methylstyrene), polyimide, electropolymerized phenol, and electrophoretic paint. Nanotips produced by these methods are conical, however disc-shaped tips can be obtained by micropipette pulling of glass sealed electrodes. Nanoscale electrodes allow for high resolution experiments of biological features of sub micron scale or single molecule analysis. "Penetration" experiments, where the tip is inserted into a microstructure (such as a thin polymer film with fixed redox centers) to probe kinetic and concentration parameters, also require the use of nanoscale electrodes. However, microelectrodes remain ideal for quantitative kinetic and feedback mode experiments due to their increased surface area.

Modification of electrodes has developed beyond the size parameter. SECM-AFM probes can act as both a force sensor and electrode through the utilization of a flattened, etched metal wire coated by electrophoretic paint. In this system, the flattened wire acts as a flexible cantilever to measure the force against a sample (AFM) as the wire electrode measures the current (SECM). Similarly, SECM functionality can be imparted into standard AFM probes by sputtering the surface with a conductive metal or by milling an insulated tip with a focused ion beam (FIB). Electron-beam lithography has also been demonstrated to reproducibly generate SECM-AFM probes using silicon wafers. AFM probe manufacturers, such as Scuba Probe Technologies fabricate SECM-AFM probes with reliable electrical contacts for operation in liquids.

Images of the chemical environment that is decoupled from localized topographies are also desirable to study larger or uneven surfaces. "Soft stylus probes" were recently developed by filling a microfabricated track on a polyethylene terephthalate sheet with a conductive carbon ink. Lamination with a polymer film produced v-shaped stylus that was cut to expose the carbon tip. The flexibility inherent in the probe design allows for constant contact with the substrate that bends the probe. When dragged across a sample, probe bending accommodates for topographical differences in the substrate and provides a quasi-constant tip-to-substrate distance, d.

Micro-ITIES probes represent another type of specialty probe that utilizes the Interface between Two Immiscible Electrolyte Solutions (ITIES). These tips feature a tapered pipette containing a solution containing a metal counter electrode, and are used to measure electron and ion transfer events when immersed in a second, immiscible liquid phase containing a counter-reference electrode.

Often the probing of liquid/liquid and air/liquid interfaces via SECM require the use of a submarine electrode. In this configuration, the electrode is fashioned into a hook shape where the electrode can be inverted and submerged within the liquid layer. The UME tip points upwards and can be positioned directly beneath the liquid/liquid or air/liquid interface. The portion of the electrode passing through the interface region is electrically insulated to prevent indirect interfacial perturbations.

Increases in the complexity of electrodes along with decreases in size have prompted the need for high resolution characterization techniques. Scanning electron microscopy (SEM), cyclic voltammetry (CV), and SECM approach curve measurements are frequently applied to identify the dimension and geometry of fabricated probes.

=== Potentiostat ===
The potentiostat biases and measures the voltage using the standard three electrode system of voltammetry experiments. The UME acts as the working electrode to apply a controlled potential to the substrate. The auxiliary electrode (or counter electrode) acts to balance the current generated at the working electrode, often through a redox reaction with the solvent or supporting electrolyte. Voltage measured with regard to the well defined reduction potential of the reference electrode, although this electrode itself does not pass any current.

=== Positioners and translators ===
SECM utilizes many of the same positioning components that are available to other materials characterization techniques. Precise positioning between the tip and sample is an important factor that is complementary to tip size. The position of the probe relative to a given point on the material surface in the x, y, and z directions is typically controlled by a motor for rough positioning coupled with a piezoelectric motor for finer control. More specifically, systems may feature an inchworm motor that directs coarse positioning with additional z control governed by a PZT piezo pusher. Stepper motors with XYZ piezo block positioner or closed-loop controller systems have also been used.

== Applications ==
SECM has been employed to probe the topography and surface reactivity of solid-state materials, track the dissolution kinetics of ionic crystals in aqueous environments, screen electrocatalytic prospects, elucidate enzymatic activities, and investigate dynamic transport across synthetic/natural membranes and other biophysical systems. Early experiments focused on these solid/liquid interfaces and the characterization of typical solution-based electrochemical systems at higher spatial resolution and sensitivities than bulk electrochemical experiments typically afford. More recently the SECM technique has been adapted to explore the chemical transfer dynamics at liquid/liquid and liquid/gas interfaces.

=== Solid/Liquid Interface ===
==== Microstructuring ====
SECM and variations of the technique have also found use in microfabrication, surface patterning, and microstructuring. A multitude of surface reactions within this context have been explored including metal deposition, etching and patterning of surfaces by enzymes. Scanning probe lithography (SPL) of surfaces can be performed using the SECM configuration. Due to size limitations in the microfabrication procedures for the UMEs, spatial resolution is decreased, affording larger feature sizes compared to other SPL techniques. An early example demonstrated patterning of dodecylthiolate self-assembled monolayers (SAMs) by moving the UME in a two-dimensional array in close proximity to the surface while applying an oxidative or reductive potential, thus locally desorbing the chemical species. Micron-sized features were effectively patterned into the SAM. An inherent benefit of SECM over other SPL techniques for surface patterning can be attributed to its ability to simultaneously acquire surface-related electrochemical information while performing lithography. Other studies have demonstrated the utility of SECM for the deposition of local gold islands as templates for attachment of biomolecules and fluorescent dyes. Such studies are suggestive of the technique’s potential for the fabrication of nanoscale assemblies, making it particularly suited to explore previously studied systems tethered to small gold clusters.

Varieties of SECM employing the micropipet tip geometry have been used to generate spatially resolved microcrystals of a solid solution. Here, glass microcapillaries with sub-micron sized orifices replace the standard UME allowing femtoliter-sized droplets to be suspended from the capillary over a conductive surface acting as the working electrode. Upon contact with the positively biased surface, the droplets of salt solutions achieve supersaturation and crystallize with well-defined, microscale geometries. Such technology could lend itself well to solid-state electrochemical sensors on microdevices.

==== Ionic dissolution ====
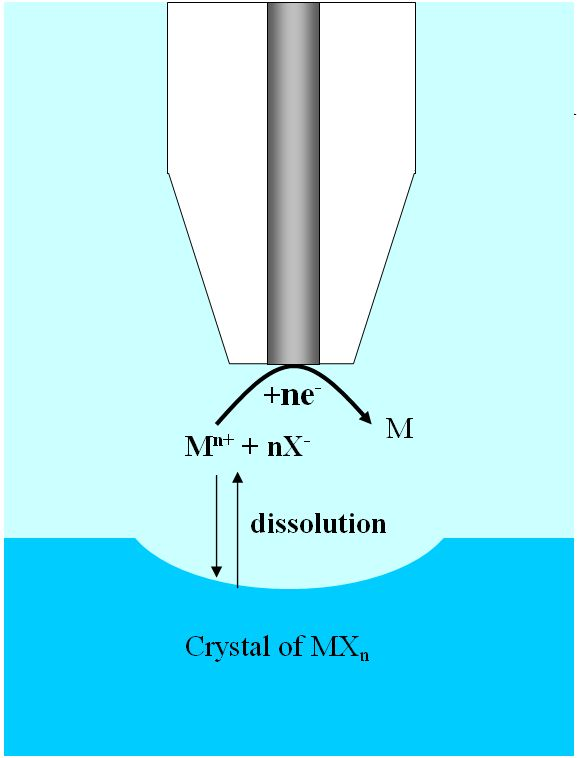
Ionic dissolution of crystal by local reduction of M^{n+}

The dissolution of ionic crystals in aqueous environments is fundamentally important to the characterization of a host of naturally occurring and synthetic systems. The high spatial resolution and three-dimensional mobility provided by the UME allows one to probe the dissolution kinetics on specific faces of single ionic crystals, whereas previous characterization techniques relied on a bulk or ensemble average measurement. Due to the high mass transfer rates associated with UMEs in the SECM configuration, it is possible to quantify systems defined by very fast reaction kinetics. In addition, UMEs allow monitoring over a wide dynamic range, making possible the study of ionic solids with large differences in solubility.

Early examples demonstrating the utility of SECM to extract quantitative rate data from such systems was carried out on CuSO_{4} crystals in an aqueous solution saturated with Cu^{2+} and SO^{2−}_{4} ions. By positioning an UME in the SECM configuration approximately one-electrode radius away from the (100) face of a CuSO_{4} crystal, it was possible to perturb the dissolution equilibrium by locally reducing Cu^{2+} at the UME surface. As the crystal face locally dissolved into copper and sulfate ions, a visible pit was formed and the chronoamperometric signal could be monitored as a function of distance between the UME and the crystal. Assuming first or second order kinetic behavior, the dissolution rate constant could then be extracted from the data. Similar studies have been performed on additional crystal systems without a supporting electrolyte.

==== Electrocatalysis investigation ====
Approaching the search for novel catalytic materials to replace precious metals used in fuel cells demands extensive knowledge of the oxygen reduction reaction (ORR) occurring at the metal surface. Often even more pressing are the physical limitations imposed by the need to survey and assess the electrocatalytic viability of large numbers of potential catalytic candidates. Some groups studying electrocatalysis have demonstrated the use of SECM as a rapid screening technique that provides local quantitative electrochemical information about catalytic mixtures and materials.

A variety of approaches have been suggested for high throughput assessment of novel metallic electrocatalysts. One functional, non-SECM approach, enabled the electrocatalytic activities of a large number of catalysts to be assessed optically by employing a technique that detected proton production on deposited arrays of proton-sensitive fluorescent dyes. Though of certain utility, the technique suffers from the failure to extract quantitative electrochemical information from any catalytic system of interest, thus requiring the quantitative electrochemical information to be obtained off-line from the array experiment. Bard et al. have demonstrated assessment of electrocatalytic activities at high volume using the SECM configuration. With this approach, direct quantitative electrochemical information from multicomponent systems can be acquired on a rapid screening platform. Such high throughput screening significantly assists the search for abundant, efficient and cost-effective electrocatalytic materials as substitutes for platinum and other precious metals.

==== Biological analysis ====
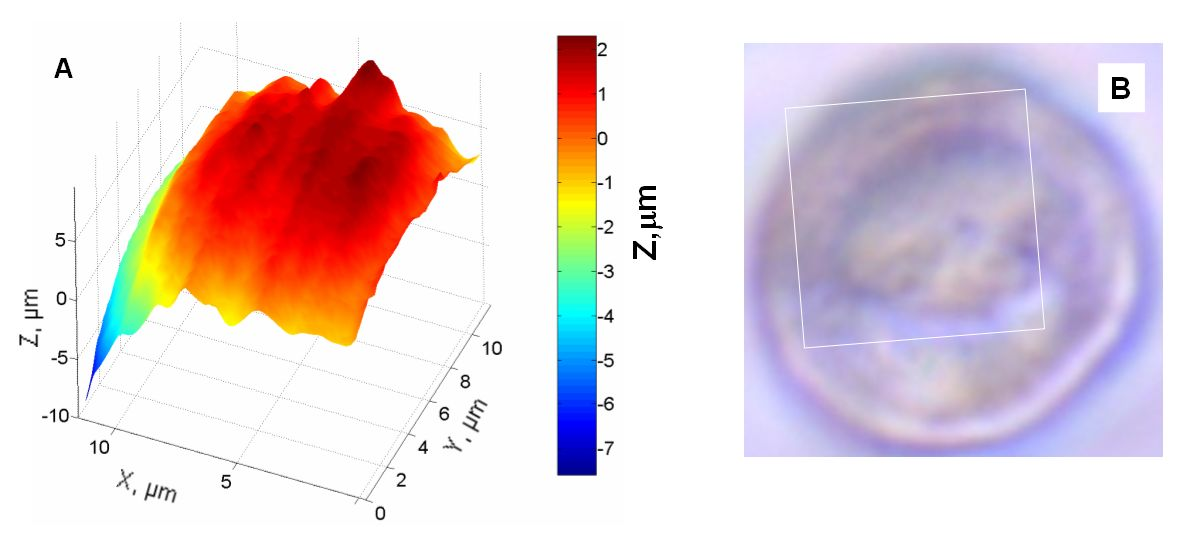
Substrate imaging (constant current mode). (A) SECM image of a portion (10 μm × 10 μm) of a human breast cell using a 120 nm radius tip. (B) Optical micrograph of the same cell showing the SECM image area delimited by a white square. SECM

The ability to probe non-conductive surfaces makes SECM a feasible method for analyzing membranes, redox active enzymes, and other biophysical systems.

Changes in intracellular redox activity may be related to conditions such as oxidative stress and cancer. Redox processes of individual living cells can be probed by SECM, which serves as a non-invasive method for monitoring intracellular charge transfer. In such measurements, the cell of interest is immobilized on a surface submerged in a solution with the oxidized form of the redox mediator and feedback mode is employed. A potential is applied to the tip, which reduces the oxidized species, generating a steady-state current, i_{T}. When the tip product enters the cell, it is re-oxidized by processes within the cell and sent back out. Depending on the rate at which tip product is regenerated by the cell, the tip current will change. A study by Liu et al. employed this method and showed that the redox states within three human breast cell lines (nonmotile, motile, and metastatic) were consistently different. SECM can not only examine immobilized cells, but also be used to study the kinetics of immobilized redox-active enzymes.

Transport of ions such as K^{+} and Na^{+} across membranes or other biological interfaces is vital to many cell processes; SECM has been employed in studying transport of redox active species across cell membranes. In feedback mode, the transfer of molecules across a membrane can be induced by collecting the transferred species at the tip and forming a concentration gradient. The changes in current can be measured as a function of molecule transport rate.

=== Liquid/liquid interface ===
==== Electrocatalysis ====
The interface between two immiscible electrolyte solutions (ITIES) can be studied using SECM with a micro-ITIES probe. The probe lies in one layer, and is moved closer to the junction while applying a potential. Oxidation or reduction depletes the substrate concentration, resulting in diffusion from either layer. At close tip-interface distances, rates of diffusion between the organic/aqueous layer for a substrate or ionic species are observed. Electron transfer rates have also been studied extensively at the ITIES. In such experiments, redox couples are dissolved in separate phases and the current at the ITIES is recorded. This is also the fundamental principle in studying transport across membranes.

=== Liquid/gas interface ===
The transfer of chemical species across air/liquid interfaces is integral to almost every physical, physiological, biological and environmental system on some level. Thus far, a major thrust in the field has been the quantification of molecular transfer dynamics across monolayer films in order to gain insight into chemical transport properties of cellular membrane systems and chemical diffusion at environmental interfaces.

Though much work has been done in the area of evaporation through monolayers at air/water interfaces, it was the introduction of SECM that provided researchers an alternative method for exploring the permeability of monolayers to small solute molecules across such interfaces. By precisely positioning a submarine electrode beneath an organic monolayer that separates an air/water interface, researchers were able to perturb the oxygen diffusion equilibrium by local reduction of oxygen in the aqueous layer, thereby eliciting diffusion across the monolayer. Diffusion dynamics of the system can be elucidated by measuring the current response at the UME with high spatial and temporal resolution. SECM is quite amenable to such kinetics studies since the current response can be monitored with high sensitivity due to the rapid mass transfer rates associated with UMEs in the SECM configuration. The three dimensional mobility of the UME also affords spatial probing of membranes to identify points of high flux or permeability. A very similar approach has been employed for diffusion studies at liquid/liquid and solid/liquid interfaces.
