= Mark Wightman =

American electrochemist (born 1947)

R. Mark Wightman
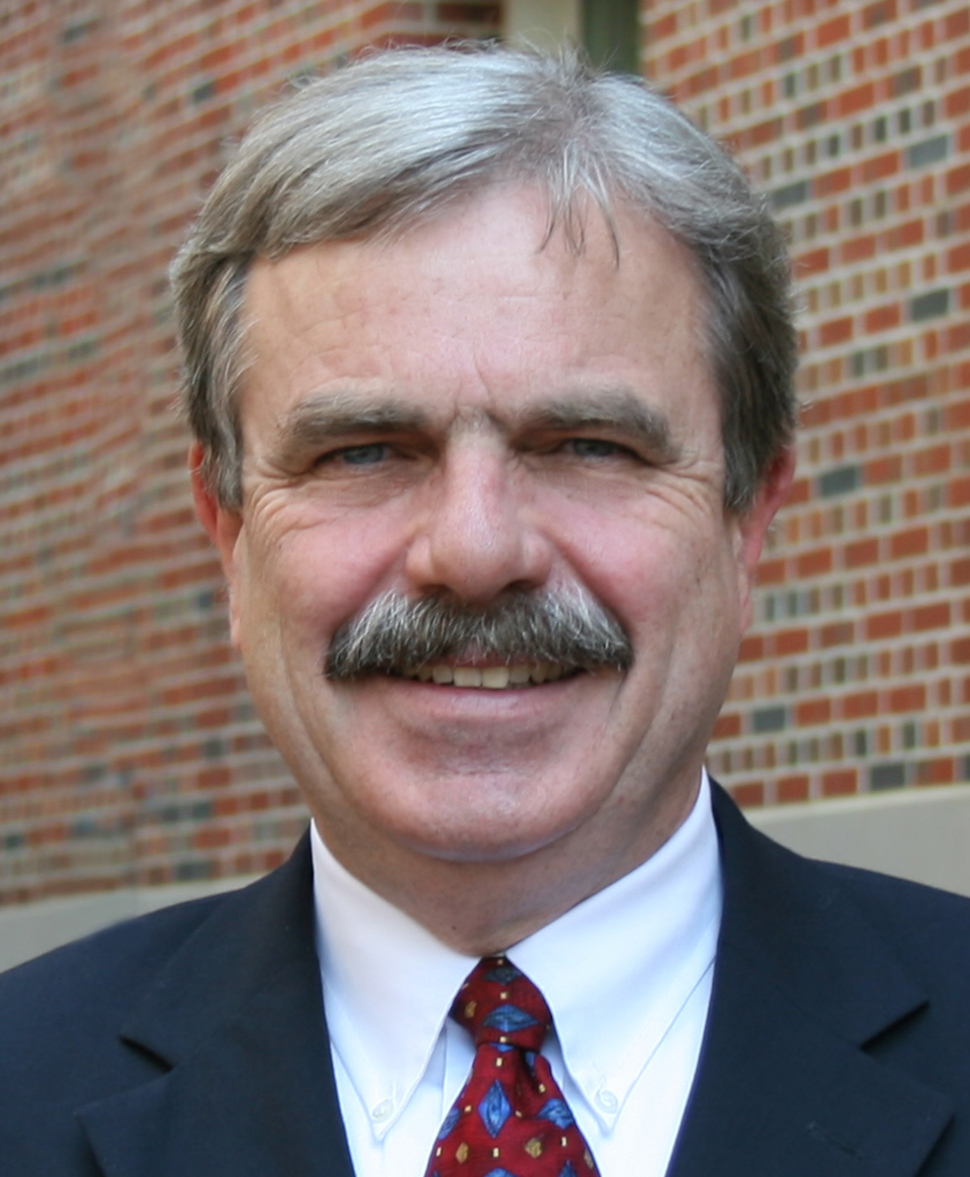
- Born: July 4, 1947 (age 79); Dorchester, Dorset, England
- Education: Erskine College (B.A.); University of North Carolina (Ph.D.); University of Kansas
- Awards: Faraday Medal; Guggenheim Fellowship; Herty Medal
- Scientific career
- Fields: Chemistry, electrochemistry, neurochemistry

Robert Mark Wightman (born July 4, 1947) is an electrochemist and professor emeritus of chemistry at the University of North Carolina at Chapel Hill. He is best known for his work in the areas of ultramicroelectrodes, electrochemistry, and neurochemistry. One of Wightman's most notable achievements is the development of the ultramicroelectrode and microelectrode voltammetry. At the same time as Wightman's innovations, the microelectrode was developed independently by Martin Fleischmann at the University of Southampton. In 2011, Wightman had the 192nd highest h-index, 74, of any living chemist. As of 2018, Wightman was an author of over 390 papers and had an h-index of 103.

== Education and academic career ==
=== Education ===
Wightman received his B.A. degree with honors from Erskine College in Due West, South Carolina in 1968 and earned a Ph.D. in chemistry from the University of North Carolina at Chapel Hill in 1974, where he worked with Royce Murray. At UNC - Chapel Hill, Wightman began focusing his research on electrochemistry. Wightman was a postdoctoral researcher from 1974 to 1976 at the University of Kansas in Lawrence, Kansas under the direction of Ralph N. Adams. His work focused on electroanalytical methods and redox chemistry.

=== Positions held ===
Wightman worked at Indiana University Bloomington in Bloomington, Indiana from 1976 to 1989. He worked as an assistant professor from 1976 to 1982, and he was promoted to the position of associate professor in 1982 and later to a full professor in 1985. He worked as a full professor until 1989 when he took a position at the University of North Carolina at Chapel Hill.

From 1989 to his retirement in 2017, Wightman was the William R. Kenan Jr. professor of chemistry at the University of North Carolina at Chapel Hill. He was appointed to the neurobiology curriculum in 1989 and was given an external faculty position at the Neuroscience Center at UNC - Chapel Hill in 2004.

Wightman also worked as a research associate at London Hospital Medical College at the University of London in 1984. He was a visiting professor at Duke University Medical Center in Durham, NC in 1997 and at the University of Cambridge in Cambridge, England in the anatomy department in 2004. Wightman was also a visiting fellow in the Churchill College at Cambridge in 2011. He has been an advisor for over 100 doctoral students, masters students, postdoctoral associates, and visiting faculty.

Wightman has also been an editor for: Biosensors & Bioelectronics, Analytical Chemistry, Journal of Electroanalytical Chemistry, Journal of Pharmacology and Experimental Therapeutics, Synapse, and Annual reviews of Analytical Chemistry.

=== Current research ===
The Wightman research group is primarily interested voltammetric sensors, particularly the ultramicroelectrode. Their small size allows for analysis and measurements at the level of a single biological cell. By coupling these electrodes to fast-scan voltammetric methods, the group has been able to monitor sub-second changes in concentrations of the neurotransmitters dopamine, norepinephrine, and serotonin in response to pharmacological and electrical stimuli.

== Awards and achievements ==
Mark Wightman's awards include but are not limited to:

- 2011 - Herty Medal
- 2010 - Sir Bernard Katz Award
- 2008 - American Chemical Society Award in Analytical Chemistry
- 2006 - Ralph N. Adams Award in Bioanalytical Chemistry
- 2002 - American Association for the Advancement of Science Fellow
- 1999 - Erskine College Academic Hall of Fame
- 1996 - Guggenheim Fellowship
- 1979-1983 - National Institutes of Health Research Career Development Award
- 1981-1983 - Alfred P. Sloan Fellowship

== Notable papers ==
- Hyperlocomotion and indifference to cocaine and amphetamine in mice lacking the dopamine transporter
- Subsecond dopamine release promotes cocaine seeking
- Detection of dopamine dynamics in the brain
- Microvoltammetric electrodes

== Patents ==
Wightman holds two patents through the United States Patent and Trademark Office, patents 4,038,158 and 4,041,346. Both patents are listed under the name: electrochemical generation of field desorption emitters.
