= Ultramicroelectrode =

An ultramicroelectrode (UME) is a working electrode with a low surface area primarily used in voltammetry experiments. The small size of UMEs limits mass transfer, which give them large diffusion layers and small overall currents at typical electrochemical potentials. These features allow UMEs to achieve useful cyclic steady-state conditions at fast scan rates (V/s) with limited current distortion. UMEs were developed independently by Wightman and Fleischmann around 1980. UMEs enable electrochemical measurements in electrolytes with high solution resistance, such as organic solvents. The low current at an UME limits the Ohmic (or iR) drop, which conventional electrodes do not limit. Furthermore, the low Ohmic drop at UMEs lead to low voltage distortions at the electrode-electrolyte interface, allowing for the use of two electrodes in a voltammetric experiment instead of the conventional three electrodes.

== Design ==
Ultramicroelectrodes are often defined as electrodes which are smaller than the diffusion layer achieved in a readily accessed experiment. A working definition is an electrode that has at least one dimension (the critical dimension) smaller than 25 μm. Platinum electrodes with a radius of 5 μm are commercially available and electrodes with critical dimension of 0.1 μm have been made. Electrodes with even smaller critical dimension have been reported in the literature, but exist mostly as proofs of concept. The most common UME is a disk shaped electrode created by embedding a thin wire in glass, resin, or plastic. The resin is cut and polished to expose a cross section of the wire. Other shapes, such as wires and rectangles, have also been reported. Carbon-fiber microelectrodes are fabricated with conductive carbon fibers sealed in glass capillaries with exposed tips. These electrodes are frequently used with in vivo voltammetry.

== Theory ==
=== Linear region ===
Every electrode has a range of scan rates called the linear region. The response to a reversible redox couple in the linear region is a "diffusion controlled peak" which can be modeled with the Cottrell equation. The upper limit of the useful linear region is bound by an excess of charging current combined with distortions created from large peak currents and associated resistance. The charging current scales linearly with scan rate while the peak current, which contains the useful information, scales with the square root of scan rate. As scan rates increase, the relative peak response diminishes. Some of the charge current can be mitigated with RC compensation and/or mathematically removed after the experiment. However, the distortions resulting from increased current and the associated resistance cannot be subtracted. These distortions ultimately limit the scan rate for which an electrode is useful. For example, a working electrode with a radius of 1.0 mm is not useful for experiments much greater than 500 mV/s.

Moving to an UME drops the currents being passed and thus greatly increases the useful sweep rate up to 10^{6} V/s. These faster scan rates allow the investigation of electrochemical reaction mechanisms with much higher rates than can be explored with regular working electrodes. The linear region of an UME only exists at fast scan rates, which is helpful when studying faster electrochemical processes. By adjusting the size of the working electrode an enormous range of speeds can be studied.

=== Steady-state region ===
Scan rates slower than the linear region are mathematically complex to model and rarely investigated. At even slower scan rates there is the steady-state region. In the steady-state region linear, voltammograms display reversible redox couples as steps rather than peaks. These steps can be modeled to gather useful electrochemical information.

To access the steady-state region, the scan rate must be lowered. However, as scan rates are slowed, the current also drops, which can reduce the reliability of the measurement. The low ratio of diffusion layer volume to electrode surface area means that regular working electrodes can yield unreliable current measurements at low scan rates. In contrast, the ratio of diffusion layer volume to electrode surface area is much higher for UMEs. When the scan rate of UME is lowered, it quickly enters the steady-state regime at useful scan rates. Although UMEs have small total currents, their steady-state currents are high compared to regular working electrodes.

=== Rg Value ===
The Rg value which is defined as R/r which is the ratio between the radius of insulation sheet (R) and the radius of the conductive material (r or a). The Rg value is a method to evaluate the quality of the UME, where a smaller Rg value means there is less interference to the diffusion towards the conductive material resulting in a better or more sensitive electrode. The Rg value obtain either by a rough estimation from a microscope image (as long as the electrode was fabricated with an homogeneous wire with a known diameter) or by a direct calculation based on the steady state current (i_{ss}) obtained from a cyclic voltamogram based on the following equation: i_{ss}=knFaDC*

Where k is a geometric constant (disk, k = 4; hemispherical, k =2π), n is the number of electrons involved in the reaction, F is the Faraday constant (96 485 C eq−1), a is the radius of the electroactive surface, D is the diffusion coefficient of the redox species (D_{ferrocene methanol}= 7.8 × 10^{−6} ; D_{ruthenium hexamine} = 8.7 × 10^{−6} cm^{2}s^{−1}) and C* is the concentration of dissolved redox species

== See also ==
- Bioelectronics
- Multielectrode array
- Scanning electrochemical microscopy
- Fast-scan cyclic voltammetry
