= Journal of Electroanalytical Chemistry =

- Discipline: Electrochemistry
- Language: English
- Edited by: X.-H. Xia

Publication details
- Former names: Journal of Electroanalytical Chemistry and Interfacial Electrochemistry
- History: 1959–present
- Publisher: Elsevier
- Frequency: 24/year
- Impact factor: 4.598 (2021)

Standard abbreviations
- ISO 4: J. Electroanal. Chem.

Indexing
- CODEN: JECHES
- ISSN: 1572-6657

Links
- Journal homepage; Online access

The Journal of Electroanalytical Chemistry is a peer-reviewed scientific journal on electroanalytical chemistry, published by Elsevier twice per month. It was originally established in 1959 under the current name, but was known as the Journal of Electroanalytical Chemistry and Interfacial Electrochemistry from 1967 to 1991. It is currently edited by X.-H. Xia (Nanjing University). The journal is associated with the International Society of Electrochemistry. While the journal is now published exclusively in English, earlier volumes sometimes published articles in French and German.

The journal, which The New York Times described as "a specialty publication not widely circulated" in 1990, became more broadly known in 1989 when Martin Fleischmann and Stanley Pons published a description of their controversial cold fusion research in it, withdrawing their work from publication in Nature after questions were raised during peer review there.

== Abstracting and indexing ==
According to the Journal Citation Reports, Journal of Electroanalytical Chemistry has a 2021 impact factor of 4.598. It is abstracted and indexed in the following bibliographic databases

- Chemical Abstracts
- Current Contents
- Metals Abstracts
- Engineering Index
- INSPEC
- Scopus
- Web of Science-Core Collection
- World Aluminum Abstracts
