= Electrochimica Acta =

- Discipline: Electrochemistry
- Language: English
- Edited by: Elena R. Savinova

Publication details
- History: 1959-present
- Publisher: Elsevier (UK)
- Frequency: Biweekly
- Impact factor: 6.6 (2022)

Standard abbreviations
- ISO 4: Electrochim. Acta

Indexing
- CODEN: ELCAAV
- ISSN: 0013-4686 (print); 1873-3859 (web)

Links
- Journal homepage; Online access

Electrochimica Acta is a peer-reviewed scientific journal covering all aspects of electrochemistry. It is the official publication of the International Society of Electrochemistry and it is published bimonthly. According to the Journal Citation Reports, the journal had a 2013 impact factor of 4.086. The current editor-in-chief is E.R. Savinova (University of Strasbourg, France).
