= Hugo Rossi =

American mathematician

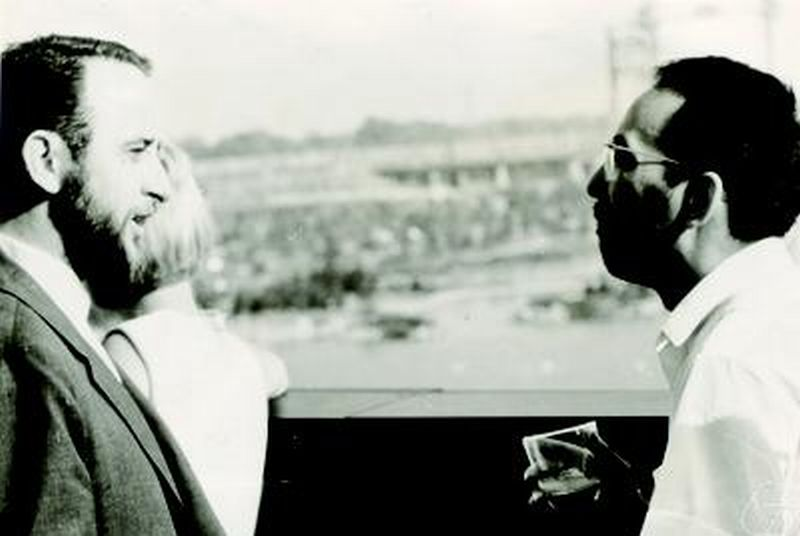
- Hugo Rossi (left) with Weishu Shih, Montreal 1967
- Education: City College of New York; Massachusetts Institute of Technology
- Awards: Fellow of the American Mathematical Society
- Scientific career
- Fields: Mathematics
- Workplaces: UC Berkeley; Princeton University; Brandeis University; University of Utah; Mathematical Sciences Research Institute
- Thesis: Maximality of algebras of holomorphic functions (1960)
- Doctoral advisor: Isadore M. Singer

Hugo E. Rossi (born 1935) is an American mathematician working in complex analysis.

Rossi graduated from the City College of New York with bachelor's degree in 1956, and graduated from Massachusetts Institute of Technology with the master's degree in 1957, and received a Ph.D. under the supervision of Isadore Singer in 1960 (Maximality of algebras of holomorphic functions). In 1960 he became an assistant professor at the University of California, Berkeley, and in the same year at Princeton University. In 1963 he became an associate professor and a professor at Brandeis University in 1966. After 11 years at Brandeis and two years as the department chair, he moved to the University of Utah in 1975, and he served as dean of the College of Science from 1987 to 1993. In 1989 Rossi went on temporary leave from his post as dean to serve as director of the National Cold Fusion Institute. Amid increasing concerns about the lack of conclusive results regarding cold fusion, Rossi resigned and returned to his post as dean of the College.

From 1983 to 1984, he was at the Institute for Advanced Study in Princeton, New Jersey. From 1980 to 1985, he was the editor of the Pacific Journal of Mathematics and from 1973 to 1978 a co-editor of transactions of the American Mathematical Society. He is a fellow of the American Mathematical Society. He served as chairman of the board of the Mathematical Sciences Research Institute from 1985 to 1989 and twice as deputy directory, from 1997 to 1995 and 2003 to 2005.

== Works ==
- Topics in complex manifolds, Presses de l´Université de Montréal 1971
- With Robert Gunning, Analytic functions of several complex variables, Prentice-Hall 1965
- Prospects in Mathematics – Invited talks on the occasion of the 250th anniversary of Princeton University, American Mathematical Society 2008

Advanced calculus – problems and applications to science and engineering, Benjamin 1970
