= ARUP Laboratories =

American nonprofit laboratory

- Type: Clinical laboratory
- Genre: Corporate histories
- Founded: 1984 in Salt Lake City, Utah
- Founders: Carl Kjeldsberg, John Matsen
- Headquarters: Salt Lake City, Utah, U.S.
- Key people: Andy Theurer, BS, CPA (CEO) | Tracy I. George, MD (President and CSO) | Julio C. Delgado MD, MS (Executive VP) | Adam Barker, PhD (COO) | Jonathan R. Genzen, MD, PhD (CMO)
- Number of employees: 4,000
- Website: www.aruplab.com

Associated Regional and University Pathologists, Inc. (ARUP Laboratories) is a Salt Lake City, Utah-based nonprofit laboratory at University of Utah's Department of Pathology. It is located in the University of Utah Research Park and provides national research lab services. ARUP has 5,000 employees and 65 laboratories.

== History ==
ARUP was founded by John Matsen and Carl Kjeldsberg, based on Lloyd Martin's vision of an independent, not-for-profit laboratory owned by the Department of Pathology.

ARUP's facilities operate with a high degree of automation. Their 65 laboratories include sorters, automated thawing and mixing, and house a two-story automated lab specimen freezer. The freezer can store 2.3 million specimens and retrieve a specimen in 2.5 minutes.

In 2003, ARUP partnered with the Utah Department of Health to create a pilot program for expanding newborn screening in Utah to include an additional 30 metabolic markers. A year later, this program became the standard for the mandatory screening of all newborns in the state of Utah.

== Leadership ==
CEO

- John Matsen, MD, 1984-1992
- Carl Kjeldsberg, MD, 1992-2009
- Sherrie Perkins, MD, PhD, 2017-2021
- Andy Theurer, BS, CPA, 2021-present
