= University of Utah Research Park =

Research park on the University of Utah campus in Salt Lake City

Coordinates: 40°45′28″N 111°49′36″W

- A building at U of U Research Park
- Interactive map of University of Utah Research Park
- Location: Salt Lake City, United States

The University of Utah Research Park, also known as Bionic Valley, is located on the campus of the University of Utah in Salt Lake City, United States. The facility has helped create many businesses based on the work of university scientists over the years. Research Park now houses more than forty companies alongside sixty-nine academic departments and employs more than 7,500 people. The annual in-state productivity of park residents exceeds $550 million.

== History ==
In 1968, the Utah state legislature allocated 320 acres along the Bonneville Shoreline Trail to develop a research park. Research Park was intended to stimulate economic development within the State of Utah and encourage students who graduate from the University of Utah to stay in Salt Lake City by providing research jobs.

In 1982, when the successful implantation of the Jarvik 7 artificial heart attracted international headlines, artificial organ and medical device research and development at the University of Utah led Science Digest and the New York Times to nickname Salt Lake City the "Bionic Valley": "the epicenter of a bioengineering effort that promises to shake up the entire health-care system."

== Companies ==
The following companies and institutes are current or former residents of research park:

- Evans and Sutherland
- Sarcos
- ARUP Laboratories
- NPS Pharmaceuticals
- bioMérieux
- Myriad Genetics
- Predictive Biotech
- Echelon Research Laboratories
- University of Utah Center for Reproductive Medicine
- Utah Poison Control Center
- Rockwell Collins
- Huntsman Chemical Corporation
- Huntsman Mental Health Institute
- National Cold Fusion Institute
- Wasatch Advisors
- Cross Creek Capital
- Navigen Pharmaceuticals
- Williams Companies
- Curza, Inc
- Blackrock Microsystems
- Actavis
- Verum TCS, LLC
- SWSA Medical Ventures, LLC
- Protherics
- Alucent Biomedical
