= Chase N. Peterson =

American physician and academic administrator

11th President of the University of Utah
- In office 1983–1991
- Preceded by: David P. Gardner
- Succeeded by: Arthur K. Smith

Personal details
- Born: December 27, 1929 Logan, Utah
- Died: September 14, 2014 (aged 84) Salt Lake City, Utah
- Education: Harvard University

Academic work
- Discipline: Medicine
- Institutions: Harvard University; University of Utah

Chase Nebeker Peterson (December 27, 1929 – September 14, 2014) was an American physician who became dean of admissions at his alma mater, Harvard University, and dean of the health sciences at the University of Utah, before being selected president of the University of Utah in 1983.

== Biography ==
Chase N. Peterson MD grew up in Logan, Utah, where his father, E. G. Peterson, was the president of Utah State University. After attending a Massachusetts boarding school, Peterson earned his bachelor's and doctor of medicine degrees from Harvard University. He practiced medicine in Utah before returning to Harvard in 1967 to become dean of admissions. Instead of using quotas to admit more American Black students, Peterson notably hired an African-American to be part of the admissions staff and thereby increased recruiting of black students.

Peterson married Ane Grethe Ballif, who after her marriage was normally referred to as Grethe Ballif Peterson. Grethe was a graduate of Brigham Young University and pursued graduate studies at Radcliffe College, Southern Connecticut State College and the University of Utah.

While at Harvard, Peterson served as a bishop of the University Ward of the Church of Jesus Christ of Latter-day Saints.

In 1978, Peterson left Harvard to become dean of health sciences at the University of Utah. In 1983 he succeeded David P. Gardner as president of the university. The first human implantation of an artificial heart and the Fleischmann–Pons experiment took place at the university on his watch. Peterson retired from the university in 1991, though continued teaching a course at the medical school until his death.

In 2006, Peterson received the Harvard Alumni Association medal.

Dr. Chase Peterson died at 84 of pneumonia on September 14, 2014.

== See also ==
- National Cold Fusion Institute - Research institute affiliated with the university during Peterson's tenure

== Sources ==
- Alan K. Parrish. "Harvard and the Gospel: An Informal History" in Regional Studies in Latter-day Saint History: New England, p. 131.
- Chase N. Peterson Presidential Records
- Biography connected with Peterson's receipt of Harvard Alumni Association medal
- Keith McCord (September 14, 2014). "Former U. president Chase Peterson dies". Deseret Digital Media.

Academic offices
Preceded by David P. Gardner	President of the University of Utah; 1983 – 1991	Succeeded by Arthur K. Smith
