= Revaz Dogonadze =

Georgian scientist

- Georgian: რევაზ დოღონაძე;
- Born: 21 November 1931; Tbilisi, Georgia
- Died: 13 May 1985 (aged 53)
- Education: Moscow Engineering Physics Institute
- Known for: Co-founder of quantum electrochemistry
- Father: Roman I. Dogonadze

Revaz Dogonadze (Georgian: რევაზ დოღონაძე; 21 November 1931 – 13 May 1985) was a notable Georgian scientist, Corresponding Member of the Georgian National Academy of Sciences (GNAS) (1982), Doctor of Physical & Mathematical Sciences (Full Doctor) (1966), Professor (1972), one of the founders of quantum electrochemistry,

== Life and works ==
He was born in 1931, in Tbilisi, Georgia. His father, Dr.Sc. Roman I. Dogonadze (1905–1970) was a professor of Agrarian Sciences. In 1955 Revaz Dogonadze graduated from the Moscow Engineering Physics Institute. He was Scientific Fellow (1958–1962) and Senior Scientific Fellow – Head of the Group of Quantum Electrochemistry (1962–1978) of the Department of Theoretical Investigations of the Moscow Institute of Electrochemistry (now Frumkin Institute of Electrochemistry of the Russian Academy of Science). He was Associate Professor (1963–1969) and Full Professor (1969–1973) of the Moscow State University. In 1961 he received a PhD degree, in 1966 a degree of Doctor of Sciences (Full Doctor).

Dogonadze was the first to view a chemical electron-transfer process as a quantum-mechanical transition between two separate electronic states, induced by weak electrostatic interactions between the molecular entities represented by the states. His group attracted students from Moscow State University and the Moscow Engineering Physics Institute, and foreign scientists as well; he was advisor for 13 PhD and 5 Dr.Sci. theses. Work of this group through the 1970s dealt with the relation between electron transfer and other condensed phase electronic processes such as light absorption, emphasizing processes involving three rather than two electronic levels, with low-temperature processes and with particular features characteristic of biological processes.

He and his pupils suggested the first quantum-mechanical model of proton transfer in polar solvents taking into account the dynamic role of the polar solvent, and created a well-known quantum-mechanical theory of kinetics of chemical, electrochemical and biochemical processes in polar liquids, as well as a quantum-mechanical theory of kinetics of atomic-molecular transformation in condensed media.

Dogonadze founded and was the first head (1978–1985) of the Department of Theoretical Investigations of the Institute of Inorganic Chemistry and Electrochemistry of the Georgian National Academy of Sciences (GNAS). In 1982-1985 he was also Head of the Department of General and Theoretical Physics of the Georgian Technical University and in 1982 was elected Corresponding Member of the GAS. In 1978-1985 he was Chairman of the Department of Electrochemical Physics of the International Society of Electrochemistry (ISE). He was a member of the editorial board of the international Journal of Electroanalytical Chemistry and Interfacial Electrochemistry and the editorial board of the Russian journal Elektrokhimia.

Dogonadze organized a number of international conferences in his subject, and was author about 190 scientific research works (among them 7 monographs). Under Dogonadze's guidance were prepared about 20 theses (13 PhD's and 5 Dr.Sc.). He was co-editor and co-author of a three-volume collective monograph The Chemical Physics of Solvation (Elsevier, Amsterdam, 1985–1986). He died in Moscow, aged 53.

Dogonadze is listed in the "Electrochemical Dictionary."

== Some main works of Revaz Dogonadze ==
- Dogonadze, RR; Kuznetsov, A.M. (1969), [Contemporary State of the Theory of Electrode Processes] (in Russian and English), Moscow: VINITI, pp. 100 pp (a monograph)
- Dogonadze, RR; Urushadze, Z.D. (1971), "Semi-Classical Method of Calculation of Rates of Chemical Reactions Proceeding in Polar Liquids", Journal of Electroanalytical Chemistry, 32 (2): 235–245, doi:10.1016/S0022-0728(71)80189-4
- Volkenshtein, M.V.; Dogonadze, R.R.; Madumarov, A.K.; Urushadze, Z.D.; Kharkats, Yu.I. (1972), "Theory of Enzyme Catalysis", Molekuliarnaia Biologiia (in Russian and English), 6: 431–439
- Volkenshtein, M.V.; Dogonadze, R.R.; Madumarov, A.K.; Urushadze, Z.D.; Kharkats, Yu.I. (1973), "Electronic and Confirmational Interactions in Enzymic Catalysis", Konfirmatsionnye Izmenenia Biopolimerov V Rastvorakh (in Russian and English): 153–157
- Dogonadze, R.R. (1971), Hush, N.S. (ed.), "Theory of Molecular Electrode Kinetics", Reactions of Molecules at Electrodes, London: Interscience, pp. 135–227 (a monograph)
- Dogonadze, R.R.; Kuznetsov, A.M. (1978), Kinetics and Catalysis. Kinetics of Heterogeneous Chemical Reactions in Solutions (in Russian), Moscow: VINITI, pp. 223 pp (a monograph).
- Dogonadze, R.R.; Marsagishvili, T.A. (1980), "Electrodynamics on Electrochemical Systems: Application to IR and Optical Transitions in Systems Containing Impurities", Journal of Surface Science, 101 (1): 439–461, Bibcode:1980SurSc.101..439D, doi:10.1016/0039-6028(80)90640-8
- Dogonadze, R.R.; Marsagishvili, T.A. (1985), Dogonadze, R.R.; Kalman, E.; Kornyshev, A.A.; et al. (eds.), "Methods of Quantum Field Theory in Electrodynamics of Solvation", The Chemical Physics of Solvation, Part A, Ch. 2, Amsterdam: Elsevier, pp. 39–76

== See also ==
- Quantum electrochemistry
- Quantum chemistry
- Electrochemistry
- List of Georgians
