= Bipolar electrochemistry =

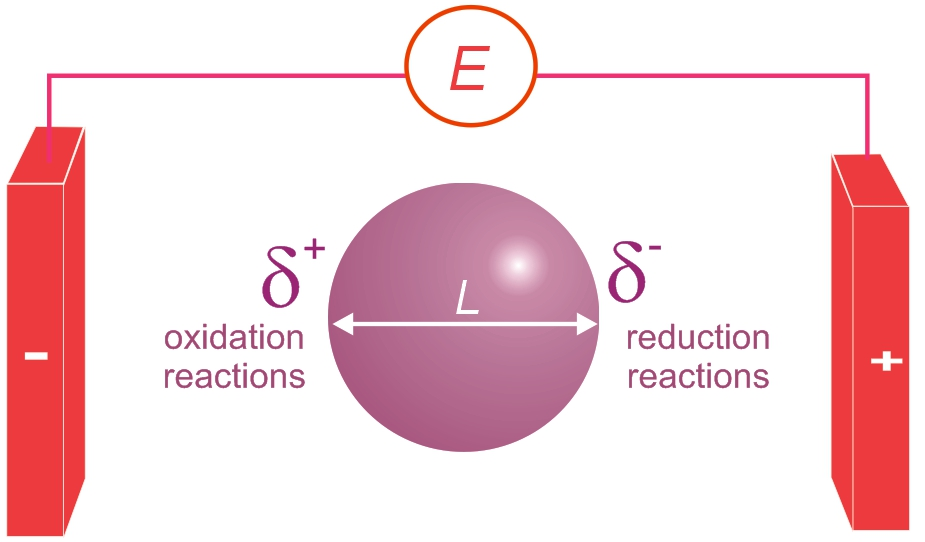
Bipolar electrochemistry concept

Bipolar electrochemistry is a phenomenon in electrochemistry based on the polarization of conducting objects in electric fields. Indeed, this polarization generates a potential difference between the two extremities of the substrate that is equal to the electric field value multiplied by the size of the object. If this potential difference is important enough, then redox reactions can be generated at the extremities of the object, oxidations will occur at one extremity coupled simultaneously to reductions at the other extremity. In a simple experimental setup consisting of a platinum wire in a weighing boat containing a pH indicator solution, a 30 V voltage across two electrodes will cause water reduction at one end of the wire (the cathode) and a pH increase (OH^{−} formation) and water oxidation at the anodic end and a pH decrease. The poles of the bipolar electrode also align themselves with the applied electric field.

== Fundamentals ==
When an electrically conductive electrode placed without a direct connection, in the same electrolyte, between an anode and cathode in an electrochemical cell with sufficient voltage being applied; the electrode will experience simultaneous cathodic and anodic reaction at both extremes. This means, the conductive electrode will become a bipolar electrode (BPE); an electrically conductive material in contact with an ionically conductive electrolyte with no direct electronic connection with power supply, that promotes electrochemical (reduction and oxidation) reactions at its both ends (poles); which mean it is a cathode and anode at the same time. This occurs due to:

=== Case (A) ===
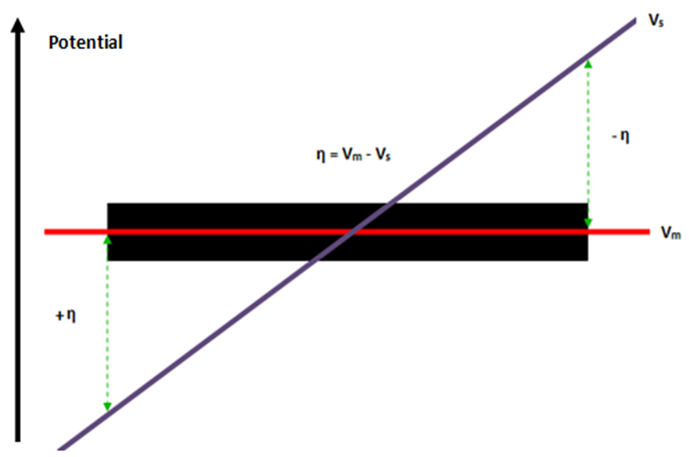
BPE potential gradient

The potential difference (η) between the electrically conductive electrode (V_{m}) and the electrolyte (V_{s}) causes a potential gradient which is distributed latterly across the BPE-electrolyte interface, with one extreme having the highest potential (anode +η) and the other extreme having the lowest potential (cathode -η). Comparing to the electrolyte potential (V_{s}) gradient/drop; the electrode potential (V_{m}) does not change between the BPE poles, this is due to the high conductivity of the electrodes which is higher than 10^{6} S/m for most of steel alloys, compared to the solution conductivity in the range of 5.5 μS/m for ionized water and 5 S/m for seawater.

=== Case (B) ===
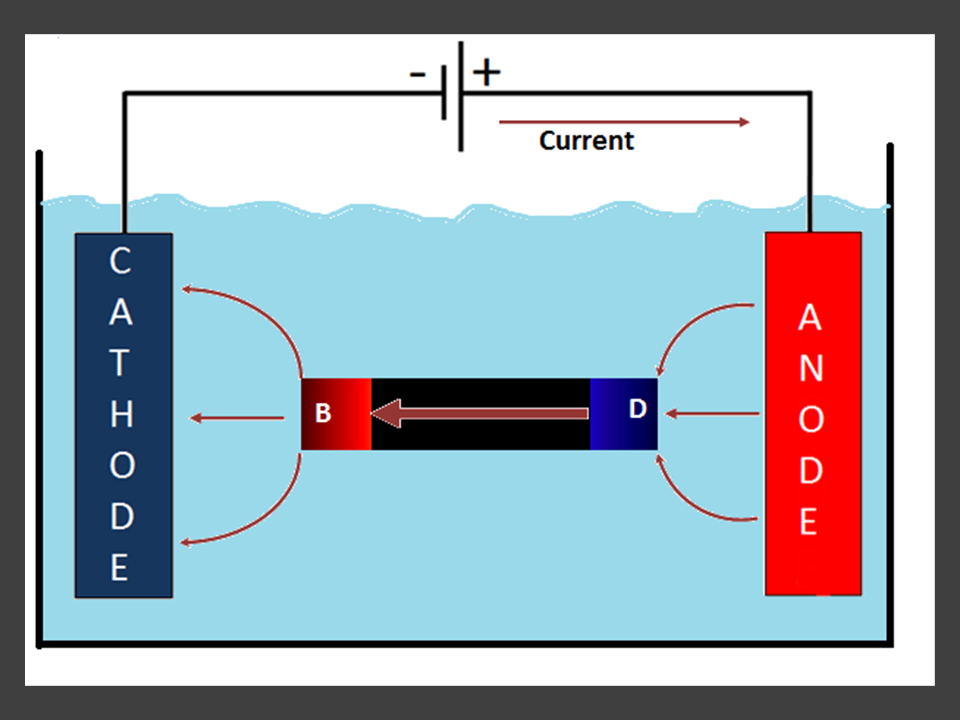
Induced Stray Current

Current flowing in the BPE because it provides less resistive current path than the electrolyte. As illustrated in the Figure; as consequence of the current entering side (D/Blue) from the anode, side D will polarise cathodically (potential will become more negative). At the other hand, side (B/Red) where the current is leaving, it will polarise anodically (potential will become more positive) and will corrode. This is due to polarisation which occurs opposite to the current direction.

This theory is almost accepted in all classic and recent cathodic protection books, and NACE publications and standards, as explanation of corrosion and coating disbondment caused by DC interference between pipelines and different structures (e.g. cathodically protected or unprotected structures, railways and HVDC). This because it is more suitable for large-scale structures in highly resistive, heterogeneous environments where solution potential (V_{s}) plays a less pivotal role and the reactions are primarily concentrated only at the poles (where current enters and leaves).

=== Case (C) ===
The potential difference at each pole of the BPE (which may or may not be enough for electrochemical reactions).

Note that the solution potential is not directly controlled by a power source (e.g. potentiostat) because it depends also on the solution composition. Therefore, for electrons to transfer to reduce species in the solution, the potential of the working electrode need to be set to a value more negative than of an electroactive molecule in the solution, and then – depending on the kinetics – electrons may transfer. In similar fashion, oxidation reactions occur. Also, according to Ohm’s law, the electric field and solution potential (V_{s}) will increase with increasing solution resistivity and the applied current at the outer-circuit.

420 Stainless Steel sample in bipolar setup in 0.1M NaCl Solution. See File:Bipolar Cell, Side.png and File:Bipolar Cell, top.png for drawing of the setup

== Utilisations ==
The phenomenon of bipolar electrochemistry is known since the 1970s and is used in industry in some electrolytic reactors. The interest of the scientific community for this concept seems to increase a lot since Martin Fleischmann and co-workers demonstrated that water splitting was possible using micrometer-sized bipolar electrodes. Recently, several applications in such domains as synthesis of dissymmetrical micro- and nano-structures analytical chemistry material science, microelectronics and microobject propulsion have been developed.
