= Electrochemical scanning tunneling microscope =

The electrochemical scanning tunneling microscope (EC-STM) is a scanning tunneling microscope that measures the structures of surfaces and electrochemical reactions in solid-liquid interfaces at atomic or molecular scales.

== Development ==
Electrochemical reactions occur in electrolytic solutions—for example electroplating, etching, batteries, and so on. On the electrode surface, many atoms, molecules, and ions adsorb and affect the reactions. In the past, in order to obtain information about the structure of electrode surfaces and reactions, the sample electrode was taken out of the electrolytic solution and measured under ultra high vacuum (UHV) conditions. In this case, the structure of the surface changed and could not be observed precisely. By using this microscope, however, these problems are resolved.

== Operation ==
In electrolytic solutions, a complicated electrical double layer of H_{2}O molecules and anions is formed. In this layer, as the distribution of anions changes with the potential of the electrode, it is necessary to control the reaction on the electrode. The potentials of the working electrodes (the sample and the tip) are controlled independently against a reference electrode. In this case, the tunneling bias voltage is the difference between the two potentials. A counter electrode is used to complete the current-carrying circuits with the working electrodes. By using these four electrodes, the electrochemical reaction is controlled precisely by the external voltage, and the surface in liquid can be observed.
