= Fast-scan cyclic voltammetry =

Method of chemical analysis

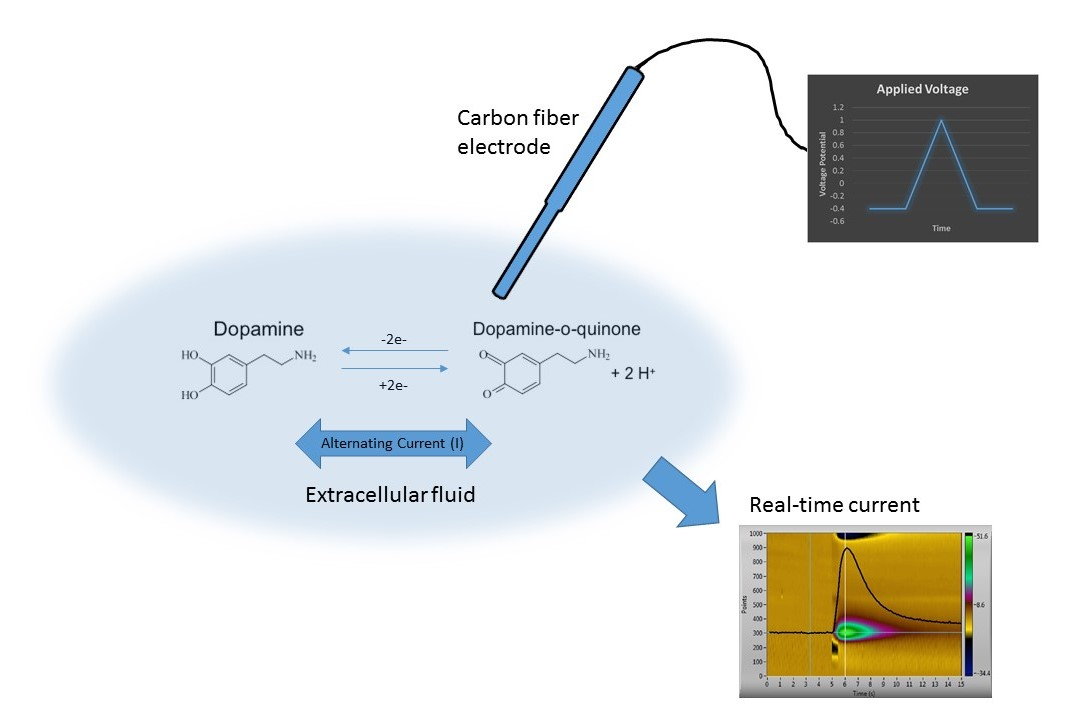
Fast scan cyclic voltammetry used to measure changing concentrations of dopamine. A carbon fiber electrode is used to quickly change the voltage to oxidize dopamine and reduce dopamine-O-quinone. The resulting alternating current is used to find the instantaneous concentration of dopamine in the extracellular fluid.

Fast-scan cyclic voltammetry (FSCV) is cyclic voltammetry with a very high scan rate (up to 1×10^{6} V·s^{−1}). Application of high scan rate allows rapid acquisition of a voltammogram within several milliseconds and ensures high temporal resolution of this electroanalytical technique. An acquisition rate of 10 Hz is routinely employed.

FSCV in combination with carbon-fiber microelectrodes became a very popular method for detection of neurotransmitters, hormones and metabolites in biological systems. Initially, FSCV was successfully used for detection of electrochemically active biogenic amines release in chromaffin cells (adrenaline and noradrenaline), brain slices (5-HT, dopamine, norepinephrine) and in vivo in anesthetized or awake and behaving animals (dopamine). Further refinements of the method have enabled detection of 5-HT, HA, norepinephrine, adenosine, oxygen, pH changes in vivo in rats and mice as well as measurement of dopamine and serotonin concentration in fruit flies.

== Principles of FSCV ==
In fast-scan cyclic voltammetry (FSCV), a small carbon fiber electrode (micrometer scale) is inserted into living cells, tissue, or extracellular space. The electrode is then used to quickly raise and lower the voltage in a triangular wave fashion. When the voltage is in the correct range (typically ±1 Volt) the compound of interest will be repeatedly oxidized and reduced. This will result in a movement of electrons in solution that will ultimately create a small alternating current (nano amps scale). By subtracting the background current created by the probe from the resulting current, it is possible to generate a voltage vs. current plot that is unique to each compound. Since the time scale of the voltage oscillations is known, this can then be used to calculate a plot of the current in solution as a function of time. The relative concentrations of the compound may be calculated as long as the number of electrons transferred in each oxidation and reduction reaction is known.

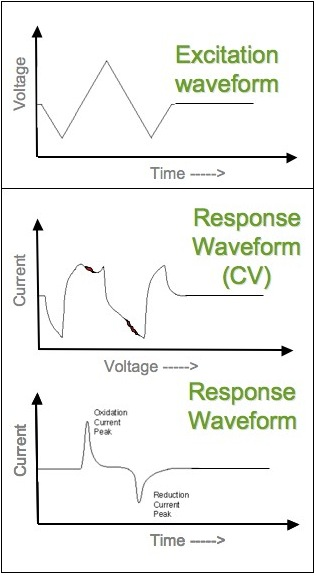
Fast cyclic voltammetry

Advantages such as chemical specificity, high resolution, and noninvasive probes make FSCV a powerful technique for detecting changing chemical concentrations in vivo. The chemical specificity of FSCV is derived from reduction potentials. Every compound has a unique reduction potential, and so the alternating voltage can be set to select for a particular compound. As a result, FSCV can be used to measure a variety of electrically active biological compounds such as catecholamines, indolamines, and neurotransmitters. Concentration changes regarding ascorbic acid, oxygen, nitric oxide, and hydrogen ions (pH) can also be detected. FSCV can also detect neurotransmitters containing tyrosine residues when a modified sawhorse waveform is applied (Liu et al., 2022). It can even be used to measure multiple compounds at the same time, as long as one has a positive and the other has a negative redox potential. High resolution is achieved by changing the voltage at very high speeds, referred to as a fast scan rate. Scan rates for FSCV are on the sub-second scale, oxidizing and reducing compounds in microseconds. Another advantage of FSCV is its ability to be used in vivo. Typical electrodes consist of small carbon fiber needles that are micrometers in diameter and able to be noninvasively inserted into live tissues. The size of the electrode also permits it to probe very specific brain regions. Thus, FSCV has proved to be effective in measuring chemical fluctuations of living organisms and has been used in conjunction with several behavioral studies.

Acceptable voltage and current ranges are common limitations of FSCV. To start, the electric potential must stay within the voltage range of the electrolysis of water (Eo = ± 1.23). Additionally, the resulting current must remain low in order to avoid cell lysis as well as cell depolarization. Fast scan cyclic voltammetry is also limited in that it only makes differential measurements; the currents it measures are only relative to the background, so they cannot be used to quantify resting concentrations. This is partially due to the fact that the basal current levels are largely affected by factors such as pH, so over longer periods of time these values tend to drift. The age of the electrode is also important, and probes tend to be less accurate the longer they are used.

This technique is also limited to quantifying the concentrations of electrically active compounds, and can only be used with select molecules in biological systems. In spite of this, there have been methods developed to measure levels of non-electric enzymes that have an electroactive substrate. However, in this scenario, the electrode probes are also a limiting factor in the data resolution. When measuring an electroactive substrate, the probe is often coated with its corresponding enzyme. In order to avoid the enzyme interacting with different substrates, the electrode is also coated with a polymer that acts as a selective filter against particular types of ions. However, when this polymer is added it lowers the speed at which the voltage scans can be made and effectively lowers the data resolution.

== Applications ==
=== Measurement of dopamine in vivo ===
FSCV is used to monitor changes in concentration of dopamine in mammalian brain in real time with sensitivity down to 1 nM. Using an acquisition rate of 10 Hz is fast enough to sample dynamics of neurotransmitter release and clearance. Pharmacological action of dopaminergic drugs such as D1 and D2 receptors agonists and antagonist (raclopride, haloperidol), dopamine transporter blockers (cocaine, nomifensine, GBR 12909) could be evaluated with FSCV. The fast acquisition rate also allows the study of dopamine dynamics during behavior.

The effects of psychostimulants (cocaine, amphetamine and methamphetamine), opioids (morphine and heroin), cannabinoids, alcohol and nicotine on dopaminergic neurotransmission and development of drug addiction was studied with FSCV.

Dopamine is a primary neurotransmitter mediating learning, goal-directing behavior and decision making. Monitoring of dopamine concentration in vivo in behaving animals with FSCV reveals dopamine coding of the brain's decision making process.

=== Measurement of other monoamine neurotransmitters ===
FSCV is used to study dynamics of exocytosis of noradrenaline and adrenaline from chromaffin cells; release of serotonin from mast cells; release of 5-HT in brain slices; release of 5-HT in brain of anesthetized rodents and fruit flies; release of norepinephrine in brain of anesthetized and freely moving rodents.
