= Stanley Pons =

American electrochemist (born 1943)

- Born: August 23, 1943 (age 83); Valdese, North Carolina, U.S.
- Citizenship: French (formerly American)
- Known for: Fleischmann–Pons cold fusion experiment
- Scientific career
- Fields: Electrochemistry
- Workplaces: University of Utah
- Doctoral advisor: Alan Bewick

Bobby Stanley Pons (born August 23, 1943) is an American electrochemist known for his work with Martin Fleischmann on cold fusion in the 1980s and 1990s.

== Early life ==
Pons was born in Valdese, North Carolina. He attended Valdese High School, then Wake Forest University in Winston-Salem, North Carolina, where he studied chemistry. He began his PhD studies in chemistry at the University of Michigan in Ann Arbor, but left before completing his PhD. His thesis resulted in a paper, co-authored in 1967 with Harry B. Mark, his adviser. The New York Times wrote that it pioneered a way to measure the spectra of chemical reactions on the surface of an electrode.

He decided to finish his PhD in England at the University of Southampton, where in 1975 he met Martin Fleischmann. Pons was a student in Alan Bewick's group; he earned his PhD in 1978.

== Career ==
On March 23, 1989, while Pons was the chairman of the chemistry department at the University of Utah, he and Martin Fleischmann announced the experimental production of "N-Fusion", which was quickly labeled by the press cold fusion. After a short period of public acclaim, hundreds of scientists attempted to reproduce the effects but generally failed. After the claims were found to be unreproducible, the scientific community determined the claims were incomplete and inaccurate.

Pons moved to France in 1992, along with Fleischmann, to work at a Toyota-sponsored laboratory. The laboratory closed in 1998 after a £12 million research investment without conclusive results. He gave up his US citizenship and became a French citizen.

== See also ==
- National Cold Fusion Institute
