= Martin Fleischmann =

British chemist (1927–2012)

- Fleischmann showing part of his cold fusion test apparatus
- Born: 29 March 1927; Karlovy Vary, Czechoslovakia
- Died: 3 August 2012 (aged 85); Tisbury, England
- Citizenship: British
- Education: Imperial College London
- Known for: Bipolar electrochemistry Surface-enhanced Raman spectroscopy Ultramicroelectrode; Fleischmann–Pons cold fusion experiment
- Awards: Fellow of the Royal Society (1986); Olin Palladium Award (1986)
- Scientific career
- Fields: Electrochemistry
- Workplaces: Durham University, Newcastle University, University of Southampton, University of Utah, IMRA
- Notable students: Stanley Pons

Martin Fleischmann FRS (29 March 1927 – 3 August 2012) was a British chemist who worked in electrochemistry. The premature announcement of his cold fusion research with Stanley Pons, regarding excess heat in heavy water, caused a media sensation and elicited skepticism and criticism from many in the scientific community.

== Personal life ==
Fleischmann was born in Karlovy Vary, Czechoslovakia, in 1927. His father was a wealthy lawyer and his mother the daughter of a high-ranking Austrian civil officer. Since his father was of Jewish heritage, Fleischmann's family moved to the Netherlands, and then to England in 1938, to avoid Nazi persecution. His father died of the complications of injuries received in a Nazi prison, after which Fleischmann lived for a period with his mother in a leased cottage in Rustington, Sussex. His early education was obtained at Worthing High School for Boys. After serving in the Czech Airforce Training Unit during the war, he moved to London to study for undergraduate and postgraduate degrees in chemistry at Imperial College London. His PhD was awarded in 1951, under the supervision of Professor Herrington, for his thesis on the diffusion of electrogenerated hydrogen through palladium foils. He met Sheila, his future wife, as a student and remained married to her for 62 years.

== Career ==
=== Electrochemistry (1950s to 1983) ===
Fleischmann's professional career was focused almost entirely on fundamental electrochemistry. Fleischmann went on to teach at King's College, Durham University, which in 1963 became the newly established University of Newcastle upon Tyne. In 1967, Fleischmann became Professor of Electrochemistry at the University of Southampton, occupying the Faraday Chair of Chemistry. From 1970 to 1972, he was president of the International Society of Electrochemists. In 1973, together with Patrick J. Hendra and A. James McQuillan, he played an important role in the discovery of Surface Enhanced Raman Scattering effect (SERS), for which the University of Southampton was awarded a National Chemical Landmark plaque by the Royal Society of Chemistry in 2013, and he developed the ultramicroelectrode in the 1980s. In 1979, he was awarded the medal for electrochemistry and thermodynamics by the Royal Society of London. In 1982 he retired from the University of Southampton. In 1985 he received the Olin Palladium Award from the Electrochemical Society, and in 1986 was elected to the Fellowship of the Royal Society. He retired from teaching in 1983 and was given an honorary professorship at Southampton University.

=== Fellowships, prizes and awards ===
- Secretary/Treasurer of the International Society of Electrochemistry (1964–1967)
- President of the International Society of Electrochemistry (1973–1974)
- Electrochemistry and Thermodynamics Medal of the Royal Society of Chemistry (1979)
- Fellowship of the Royal Society (1985)
- Olin Palladium Medal of the Electrochemical Society (1986)

=== Cold fusion (1983 to 1992) ===
Fleischmann confided to Stanley Pons that he might have found what he believed to be a way to create nuclear fusion at room temperatures. From 1983 to 1989, he and Pons spent $100,000 in self-funded experiments at the University of Utah. Fleischmann wanted to publish it first in an obscure journal, and had already spoken with a team that was doing similar work in a different university for a joint publication. The details have not surfaced, but it seems that the University of Utah wanted to establish priority over the discovery and its patents by making a public announcement before the publication. In an interview with 60 Minutes in 2009, Fleischmann said that the public announcement was the university's idea, and that he regretted doing it. This decision, perceived as short-circuiting the way science is usually communicated to other scientists, later caused heavy criticism against Fleischmann and Pons.

On 23 March 1989 the work was announced at a press conference as "a sustained nuclear fusion reaction," which was quickly labelled by the press as cold fusion – a result previously thought to be unattainable. On 26 March Fleischmann warned on the Wall Street Journal Report not to try replications until a published paper was available two weeks later in Journal of Electroanalytical Chemistry, but that did not stop hundreds of scientists who had already started work at their laboratories the moment they heard the news on 23 March, and more often than not they failed to reproduce the effects. Those who failed to reproduce the claim attacked the pair for fraudulent, sloppy, and unethical work; incomplete, unreproducible, and inaccurate results; and erroneous interpretations. When the paper was finally published, both electrochemists and physicists called it "sloppy" and "uninformative", and it was said that, had Fleischmann and Pons waited for the publication of their paper, most of the trouble would have been avoided because scientists would not have gone so far in trying to test their work.

Fleischmann and Pons sued an Italian journalist who had published very harsh criticisms of them, but the judge rejected the case saying that criticisms were appropriate given the scientists' behaviour, the lack of evidence since the first announcement, and the lack of interest shown by the scientific community, and that they were an expression of the journalist's "right of reporting".

=== Retirement (from 1995) ===
In 1992, Fleischmann moved to France with Pons to continue their work at the IMRA laboratory (part of Technova Corporation, a subsidiary of Toyota), but in 1995 he retired and returned to England. He co-authored further papers with researchers from the US Navy and Italian national laboratories (INFN and ENEA), on the subject of cold fusion. In March 2006, "Solar Energy Limited" division "D2Fusion Inc" announced in a press release that Fleischmann, then 79, would be acting as their senior scientific advisor.

=== Death ===
Fleischmann died at home in Tisbury, Wiltshire on 3 August 2012, of natural causes. He had suffered from Parkinson's disease, diabetes and heart disease. He was survived by his son and two daughters.

== Legacy ==
While holding the Faraday Chair of Electrochemistry, he and Graham Hills established in the late 1960s the Electrochemistry Group of the University of Southampton.

Fleischmann produced over 272 scientific papers and book chapters on the field of electrochemistry. He contributed to the fundamental theory of:

- Potentiostat design
- Microelectrodes
- Electrochemical nucleation
- Surface-enhanced Raman spectroscopy
- In-situ X-ray techniques
- Organic electrochemistry
- Electrochemical engineering
- Biological electrodes
- Corrosion

The Martin Fleischmann Memorial Project was started in 2012 in his honour to gather together research from around the world connected to LENR (low-energy nuclear reactions).

== Peer-reviewed papers on "Cold Fusion" ==
- Fleischmann, Martin; Pons, Stanley; Anderson, Mark W.; Li, Lian Jun; Hawkins, Marvin (1990). "Calorimetry of the palladium-deuterium-heavy water system". Journal of Electroanalytical Chemistry. 287 (2): 293–348. doi:10.1016/0022-0728(90)80009-U.
- Fleischmann, Martin; Pons, Stanley (1992). "Some Comments on The Paper 'Analysis of Experiments on The Calorimetry of LiOD-D_{2}O Electrochemical Cells,' R.H. Wilson et al., Journal of Electroanalytical Chemistry, Vol. 332, (1992)". Journal of Electroanalytical Chemistry. 332 (1–2): 33–53. doi:10.1016/0022-0728(92)80339-6.
- Fleischmann, Martin; Pons, S (1993). "Calorimetry of the Pd-D2O system: from simplicity via complications to simplicity". Physics Letters A. 176 (1–2): 118–129. Bibcode:1993PhLA..176..118F. doi:10.1016/0375-9601(93)90327-V.
