= Quantum electrochemistry =

The scientific school of Quantum electrochemistry began to form in the 1960s under Revaz Dogonadze. Generally speaking, the field comprises the notions arising in electrodynamics, quantum mechanics, and electrochemistry; and so is studied by a very large array of different professional researchers. The fields they reside in include, chemical, electrical and mechanical engineering, chemistry and physics.

More specifically, quantum electrochemistry is the application of quantum mechanical tools such as density functional theory to the study of electrochemical processes, including electron transfer at electrodes. It also includes Marcus theory and quantum rate theory, the latter being a method of describing electrochemistry using first principle quantum mechanics and concepts of conductance quantum and quantum capacitance.

== History and contributors ==
The first development of "quantum electrochemistry" is somewhat difficult to pin down. This is not very surprising, since the development of quantum mechanics to chemistry can be summarized as the application of quantum wave theory models to atoms and molecules. This being the case, electrochemistry, which is particularly concerned with the electronic states of some particular system, is already, by its nature, tied into the quantum mechanical model of the electron in quantum chemistry. There were proponents of quantum electrochemistry, who applied quantum mechanics to electrochemistry with unusual zeal, clarity, and precision. Among them were Revaz Dogonadze and his co-workers. They developed one of the early quantum mechanical models for proton transfer reactions in chemical systems. Dogonadze is a particularly celebrated promoter of quantum electrochemistry and is also credited with forming an international summer school of quantum electrochemistry centered in Yugoslavia. He was the main author of the Quantum-Mechanical Theory of Kinetics of the Elementary Act of Chemical, Electrochemical and Biochemical Processes in Polar Liquids. Another important contributor is Rudolph A. Marcus, who won the Nobel Prize in Chemistry in 1992 for his Theory of Electron Transfer Reactions in Chemical Systems. Recently, Marcus theory has been shown to be part of a more general concept associated with the quantum rate theory, a theory that predicts the rate of electron transfer (electrochemistry being a particular case) based on the uses of conductance quantum and quantum capacitance concepts.

== See also ==
- Electrochemistry
- Quantum chemistry
- Quantum mechanics
