= International Society of Electrochemistry =

Organisation involved in scholarly research

The International Society of Electrochemistry (ISE) is a global scientific society founded in 1949. The Head Office of ISE is located now in Lausanne, Switzerland. ISE is a Member Organization of IUPAC. The Society has now more than 1900 Individual Members, 15 Corporate Members (Universities and non-profit research organizations from Belgium, Croatia, Finland, Germany, India, Italy, New Zealand, Poland, Spain, Switzerland and Serbia) and 16 Corporate Sustaining Members. ISE has also 8 Divisions and Regional Representatives.

ISE's objectives are:

- to advance electrochemical science and technology
- to disseminate scientific and technological knowledge
- to promote international cooperation in electrochemistry
- to maintain a high professional standard among its members.

== See also ==
- Electrochemistry
- Quantum electrochemistry
- Revaz Dogonadze
- Rudolph A. Marcus
