= Pyroelectric fusion =

Nuclear fusion technique

Pyroelectric fusion refers to the technique of using pyroelectric crystals to generate high strength electrostatic fields to accelerate deuterium ions (tritium might also be used someday) into a metal hydride target also containing deuterium (or tritium) with sufficient kinetic energy to cause these ions to undergo nuclear fusion. It was reported in April 2005 by a team at UCLA. The scientists used a pyroelectric crystal heated from −34 to 7 °C (−29 to 45 °F), combined with a tungsten needle to produce an electric field of about 25 gigavolts per meter to ionize and accelerate deuterium nuclei into an erbium deuteride target. Though the energy of the deuterium ions generated by the crystal has not been directly measured, the authors used 100 keV (a temperature of about 10^{9} K) as an estimate in their modeling. At these energy levels, two deuterium nuclei can fuse to produce a helium-3 nucleus, a 2.45 MeV neutron and bremsstrahlung. Although it makes a useful neutron generator, the apparatus is not intended for power generation since it requires far more energy than it produces.

== History ==
The process of light ion acceleration using electrostatic fields and deuterium ions to produce fusion in solid deuterated targets was first demonstrated by Cockcroft and Walton in 1932 (see Cockcroft–Walton generator). That process is used in miniaturized versions of their original accelerator, in the form of small sealed tube neutron generators, for petroleum exploration.

The process of pyroelectricity has been known from ancient times. The first use of a pyroelectric field to accelerate deuterons was in a 1997 experiment conducted by Drs. V.D. Dougar Jabon, G.V. Fedorovich, and N.V. Samsonenko. This group was the first to utilize a lithium tantalate (LiTaO_{3}) pyroelectric crystal in fusion experiments.

The novel idea with the pyroelectric approach to fusion is in its application of the pyroelectric effect to generate accelerating electric fields. This is done by heating the crystal from −34 °C to +7 °C over a period of a few minutes.

Nuclear D-D fusion driven by pyroelectric crystals was proposed by Naranjo and Putterman in 2002. It was also discussed by Brownridge and Shafroth in 2004. The possibility of using pyroelectric crystals in a neutron production device (by D-D fusion) was proposed in a conference paper by Geuther and Danon in 2004 and later in a publication discussing electron and ion acceleration by pyroelectric crystals. None of these later authors had prior knowledge of the earlier 1997 experimental work conducted by Dougar Jabon, Fedorovich, and Samsonenko which mistakenly believed that fusion occurred within the crystals. The key ingredient of using a tungsten needle to produce sufficient ion beam current for use with a pyroelectric crystal power supply was first demonstrated in the 2005 Nature paper, although in a broader context tungsten emitter tips have been used as ion sources in other applications for many years. In 2010, it was found that tungsten emitter tips are not necessary to increase the acceleration potential of pyroelectric crystals; the acceleration potential can allow positive ions to reach kinetic energies between 300 and 310 keV.

=== 2005–2009 ===
In April 2005, a UCLA team headed by chemistry professor James K. Gimzewski and physics professor Seth Putterman utilized a tungsten probe attached to a pyroelectric crystal to increase the electric field strength. Brian Naranjo, a graduate student working under Putterman, conducted the experiment demonstrating the use of a pyroelectric power source for producing fusion on a laboratory bench top device. The device used a lithium tantalate (LiTaO_{3}) pyroelectric crystal to ionize deuterium atoms and to accelerate the deuterons towards a stationary erbium dideuteride (ErD_{2}) target. Around 1000 fusion reactions per second took place, each resulting in the production of an 820 keV helium-3 nucleus and a 2.45 MeV neutron. The team anticipates applications of the device as a neutron generator or possibly in microthrusters for space propulsion.

A team at Rensselaer Polytechnic Institute, led by Yaron Danon and his graduate student Jeffrey Geuther, improved upon the UCLA experiments using a device with two pyroelectric crystals and capable of operating at non-cryogenic temperatures.

Pyroelectric fusion has been hyped in the news media, which overlooked the work of Dougar Jabon, Fedorovich and Samsonenko. Pyroelectric fusion is not related to the earlier claims of fusion reactions, having been observed during sonoluminescence (bubble fusion) experiments conducted under the direction of Rusi Taleyarkhan of Purdue University. Naranjo of the UCLA team was one of the main critics of these earlier prospective fusion claims from Taleyarkhan.

=== 2010–present ===
The first successful results with pyroelectric fusion using a tritiated target was reported in 2010. Putterman and Naranjo worked with T. Venhaus of Los Alamos National Laboratory to measure a 14.1 MeV neutron signal far above background.

== See also ==
- Neutron sources
- Neutron generator
- Pyroelectricity
