= Seth Putterman =

American physicist

Seth J. Putterman
- Born: December 18, 1945 (age 80); New York City, New York, USA
- Education: Cooper Union; California Institute of Technology; Rockefeller University
- Known for: Sonoluminescence
- Scientific career
- Workplaces: University of California, Los Angeles
- Thesis: Towards a Macroscopic Theory of Superfluids (1970)
- Doctoral advisor: George Uhlenbeck
- Website: acoustics-research.physics.ucla.edu

Seth J. Putterman (born December 18, 1945) is an American physicist. He is known to have an eclectic approach to research topics that broadly revolves around energy-focusing phenomena in nonlinear, continuous systems, with particular interest in turbulence, sonoluminescence, sonofusion and pyrofusion.

== Education and career ==
Putterman studied physics at Cooper Union in New York for two years before transferring to the California Institute of Technology in Pasadena, graduating in 1966. In 1970, he received his doctorate under George Uhlenbeck at the Rockefeller University in New York. His PhD work dealt with quantum fluids and he contributed to the theory of superfluidity of helium.

Putterman is a Professor of Physics and Astronomy at the California NanoSystems Institute at the University of California, Los Angeles. His group demonstrated X-ray generation from the triboelectric effect by peeling a strip of Scotch tape in 2008.

== Honors and awards ==
Putterman received the Sloan Research Fellowship from the Alfred P. Sloan Foundation in 1972. He is a Fellow of the American Physical Society (1997) and the Acoustical Society of America.

== See also ==
- Sonoluminescence
- Pyroelectric fusion
- Rusi Taleyarkhan
