= MBSL =

MBSL may refer to:

- Multi-bubble sonoluminescence
- Moser Baer Solar Limited
- Meters below sea level
