= Tantalocene trihydride =

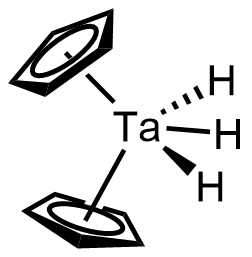

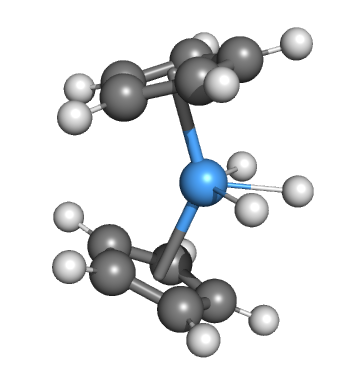

Names
- IUPAC name bis(η^{5}-cyclopentadienyl)trihydridotantalum

Identifiers
CAS Number	12117-02-1
3D model (JSmol)	Interactive image
PubChem CID	22138501
- InChI: InChI=1S/2C5H5.Ta.3H/c2*1-2-4-5-3-1;;;;/h2*1-5H;;;;/q2*-1;+2;;; Key: JFNGVUYCDFHOGO-UHFFFAOYSA-N
- SMILES: [H-][Ta+5]12345678([H-])([H-])([CH]=9[CH]4=[CH]3[CH-]2[CH]91)[CH]=%10[CH]8=[CH]7[CH-]6[CH]%105

Properties
Chemical formula	C_{10}H_{13}Ta
Molar mass	314.162 g·mol^{−1}
Appearance	white crystalline solid
Melting point	187–189 °C (369–372 °F; 460–462 K) (decomp.)
Solubility in water	sparingly soluble in light petroleum, moderately soluble in benzene
- Except where otherwise noted, data are given for materials in their standard state (at 25 °C [77 °F], 100 kPa). Infobox references

Tantalocene trihydride, or bis(η^{5}-cyclopentadienyl)trihydridotantalum, is an organotanalum compound in the family of bent metallocenes consisting of two cyclopentadienyl rings and three hydrides coordinated to a tantalum center. Its formula is TaCp_{2}H_{3}, and it is a white crystalline compound that is sensitive to air. It is the first example of a molecular trihydride of a transition metal.

== Synthesis ==
The synthesis of tantalocene trihydride was first reported by Green, McCleverty, Pratt, and Wilkinson in 1961. Tantalum pentachloride was added to a solution of sodium cyclopentadienide in tetrahydrofuran and an excess of sodium borohydride with yields reaching 60%, although the authors report that the preparation does not always succeed.

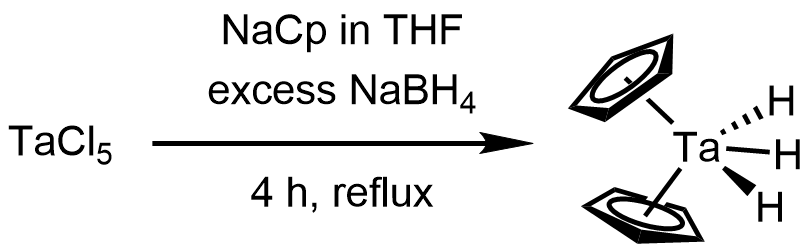

A more reliable and reproducible method was reported by Green and Moreau in 1978. A suspension of tantalocene dichloride in toluene was reacted with NaAlH_{2}(OCH_{2}CH_{2}OCH_{3})_{2} and then hydrolyzed to form tantalocene trihydride, though with a lower yield of 42%.

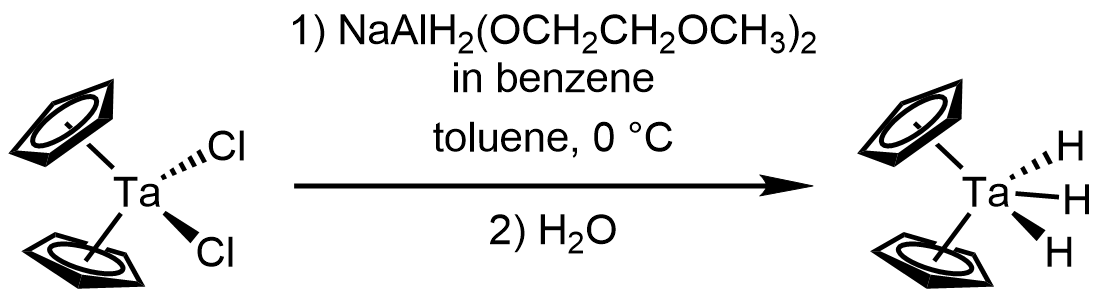

== Characterization ==
The high-field signals in the ^{1}H NMR spectrum corresponding to the hydrides appear at τ = 11.63 ppm (δ = -1.63 ppm, 1H, t, J = 9 Hz) and τ = 13.02 ppm (δ = -3.02 ppm, 2H, d, J = 9 Hz). The peak splitting pattern is characteristic of A_{2}B groupings, which means that there are two equivalent hydrides, and one non-equivalent hydride. The signal for the hydrogen atoms on the cyclopentadienyl rings appear at τ = 5.24 ppm (δ = 4.76 ppm, 10H, s).

A strong, sharp absorption band can be seen in the infrared spectra of TaCp_{2}H_{3} at 1735 cm^{−1}, which corresponds to the Ta-H bond stretching frequency.

As opposed to other metallocene hydrides, such as ReCp_{2}H, MoCp_{2}H_{2}, and WCp_{2}H_{2}, TaCp_{2}H_{3} does not behave as a base, even in trifluoroacetic acid. It is decomposed by aqueous acids. This is consistent with the fact that the tantalum center does not have any lone pairs, since all orbitals have been utilized in bonding with the ligands.

The two cyclopentadienyl rings are in a bent conformation as confirmed by neutron diffraction studies where the ring-to-tantalum-to-ring bending angle is 139.9°. The three hydrides lie in the same plane as the tantalum center with the three Ta-H bond distances being essentially equal (1.769(8) Å, 1.775(9) Å, and 1.777(9) Å).

== Reactivity ==
Tantalocene trihydride has been found to be capable of activating C-H bonds by oxidative addition as seen through hydrogen/deuterium exchange, involved in the insertion of phosphines, and capable of forming post transition metal ethyl adducts.

=== Catalysis of hydrogen–deuterium exchange ===
Barefield, Parshall, and Tebbe discovered that when TaCp_{2}H_{3} was heated at 100 °C in benzene-d_{6} under a hydrogen atmosphere, HD and D_{2} were detected along with H_{2} in the vapor phase in a ratio of 41.1 to 41.6 to 17.0 (H_{2}:HD:D_{2}). This indicates that there is catalytic exchange, and that the complex is able to cleave the C-D bonds of the solvent.

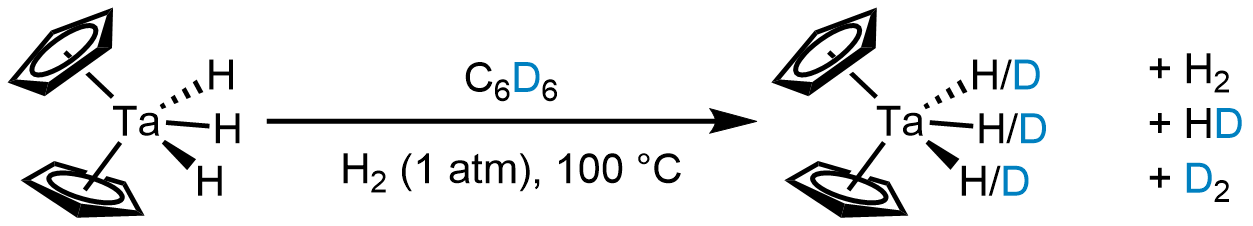

In another study by Foust et al., when TaCp_{2}H_{3} was photolyzed for 36 h at 15 °C in benzene-d_{6}, analysis of the evolved gases revealed that there was a mixture of H_{2}, HD, and D_{2}. If carbon monoxide was present in the reaction with toluene as a solvent, the CO containing product TaCp_{2}(CO)H was formed through the intermediate species TaCp_{2}H.

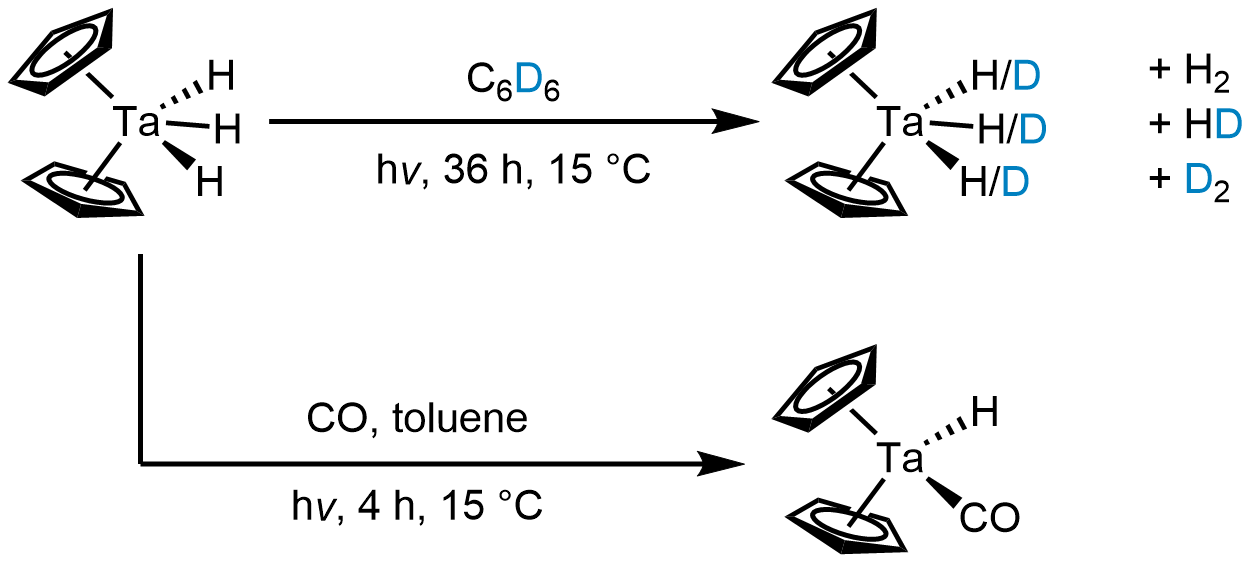

=== Activation of C^{sp3}-H bonds by oxidative addition ===
Neufeldt et al. explored the activation of aliphatic C-H bonds by TaCp_{2}H_{3} and related monosubstituted cyclopentadienyl rings experimentally and computationally. In order to go through oxidative addition, there must be an initial loss of H_{2} from TaCp_{2}H_{3}. Then, the monohydride complex can form a π-complex with an unsaturated solvent, such as benzene. Finally, the complex oxidatively adds to the C-H bond. Intramolecular and intermolecular C-H activation was found to be possible.

A σ-complex will form instead if the solvent used is aliphatic, such as octane. The authors observed a change in the hydride NMR signals due to H/D exchange when TaCp_{2}H_{3} was heated to 120 °C for 48 h in octane-d_{18} and methylcyclohexyl-d_{14}.

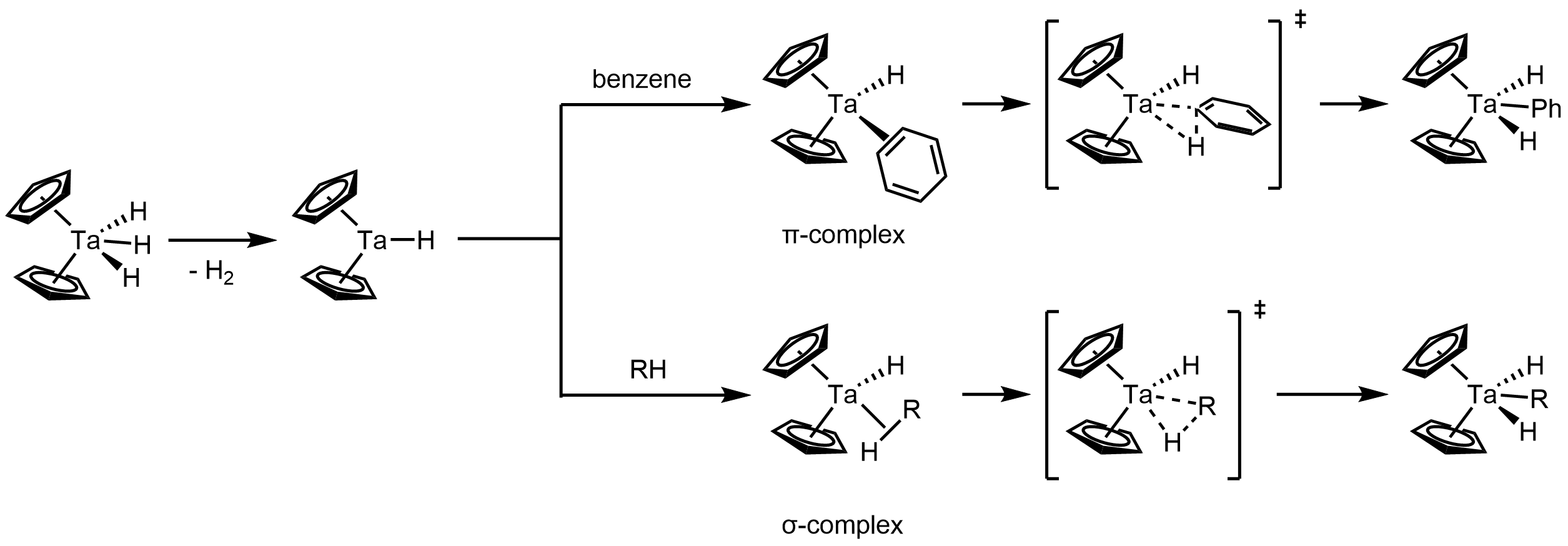

The loss of another hydrogen molecule from the products can lead to β-hydride elimination, which forms complexes of the TaCp_{2}(H)L, with L being an unsaturated π-ligand, having their own reactivity.

=== Phosphine insertion ===
The first phosphido derivative of tantalocene was obtained by the insertion of ClPPh_{2} into the Ta-H bond, resulting in the precipitation of the white ionic compound [TaCp_{2}H_{2}(PHPh_{2})]Cl. Deprotonation of this compound results in pale yellow crystals of the dihydride phosphido complex TaCp_{2}H_{2}PPh_{2}. Through X-ray diffraction studies, the Ta-P bond distance was 2.595(3) Å, which is typical of a single bond between tantalum and phosphorus.

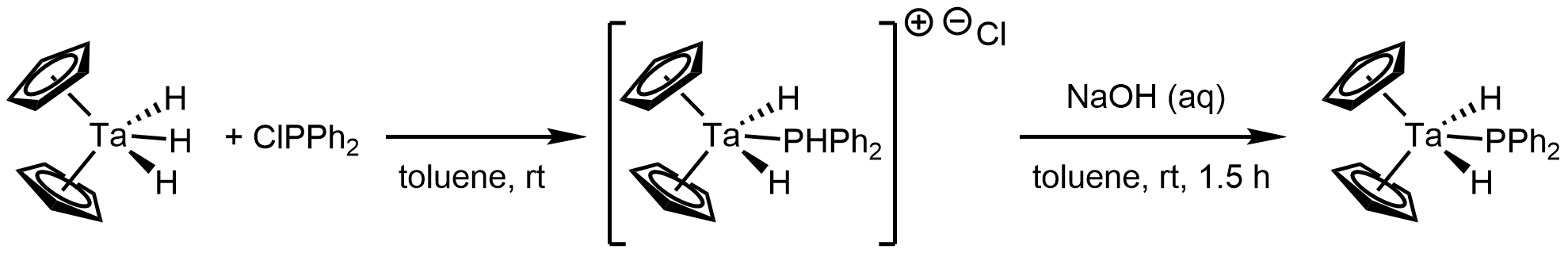

ClPPh_{2} has been shown to insert into the niobium analogue, NbCp_{2}H_{3}. However, the deprotonation step results in the monohydride phosphido complex NbCp_{2}H(PHPh_{2}) instead. The authors of this article theorize that stabilization of hydrido phosphide complexes of the third row transition metals is due to higher M-H bond energy when compared to those of the second row.

=== Lewis acid-base adducts ===
TaCp_{2}H_{3} can form Lewis acid-base adducts with AlEt_{3}, GaEt_{3}, ZnEt_{2}, and CdEt_{2} at the unique hydride. As opposed to promotion of catalysis of olefin reactions with Lewis acids like AlEt_{3} such as in Ziegler-Natta catalysts, triethylaluminium seems to deactivate the hydride ligand toward ethylene insertion.

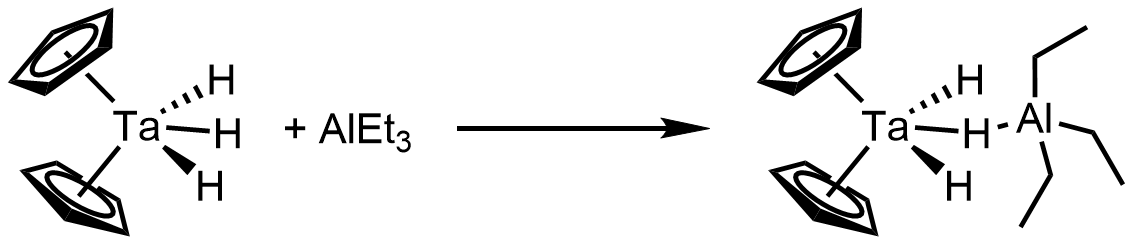
Proposed structure of the Lewis acid-base adduct of TaCp_{2}H_{3} and AlEt_{3}.
