= Neutristor =

Solid-state neutron generator

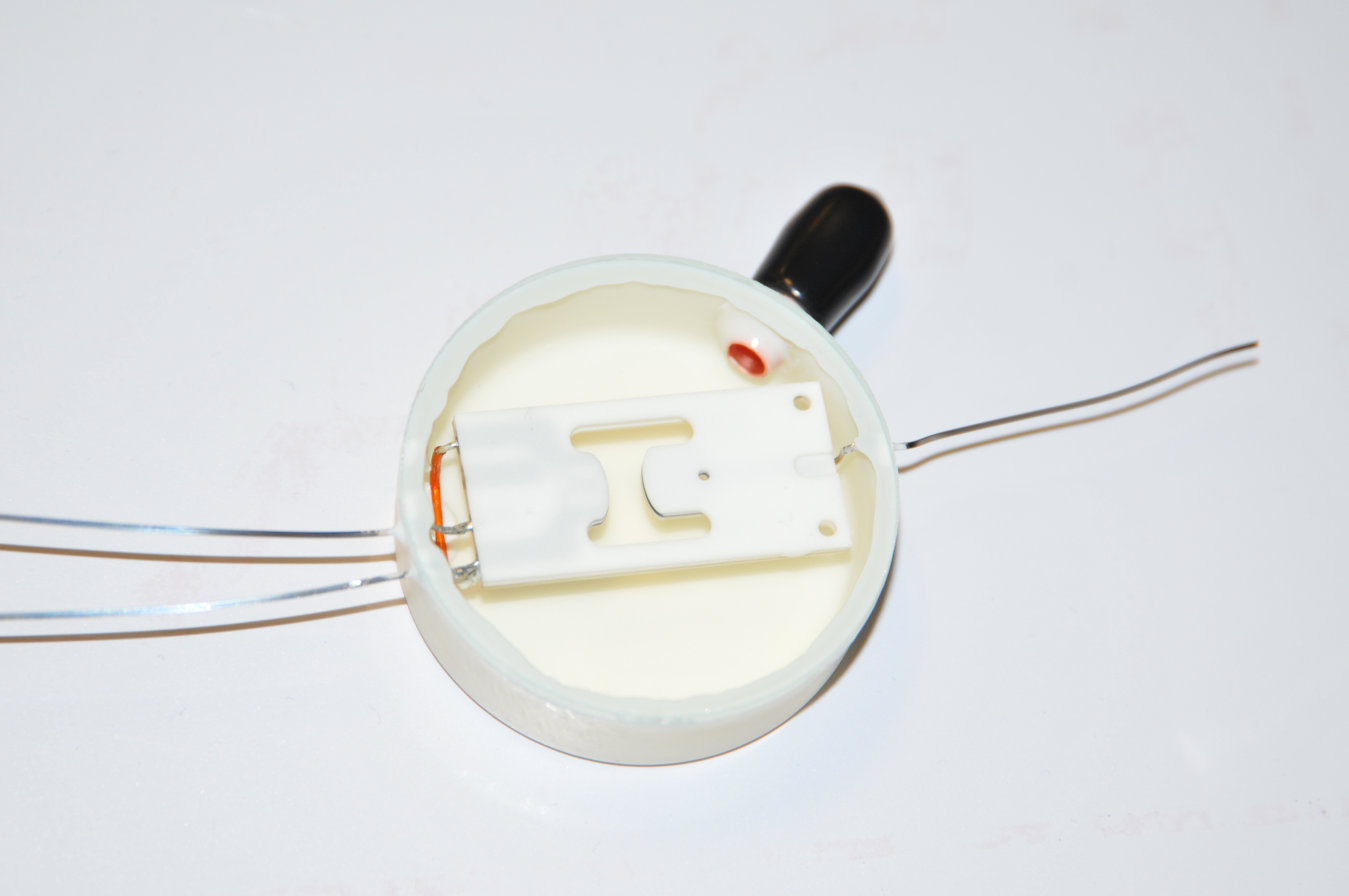
Neutristor in an inexpensive vacuum sealed package ready for testing

A neutristor is a compact neutron generator made using solid-state electronics, invented at Sandia National Laboratories. Its primary purpose is to act as a light-weight, cheaper, and safer alternative to standard neutron generation devices, benefiting industries and processes such as oilfield operations, heavy mechanical production, neutron activation analysis, and medicine due to these reduced costs. It operates on the standard operational principles of neutron generators. Additionally, Sandia National Laboratories is creating a new generation of neutristors that do not require a vacuum environment to operate.

== Advantages ==
A neutristor is cheaper and smaller than standard accelerator-based neutron generators. Normal neutron generators use a three-inch (7.5 cm) cylinder, too large for implanted neutron capture therapy and for neutron inspection of weld flaws.
