= Organotantalum chemistry =

Chemistry of compounds containing a carbon-to-tantalum bond

Tantalum-Carbon Bond

Organotantalum chemistry is the chemistry of chemical compounds containing a carbon-to-tantalum chemical bond. A wide variety of compound have been reported, initially with cyclopentadienyl and CO ligands. Oxidation states vary from −1 to +5.

== Classes of organotantalum compounds ==
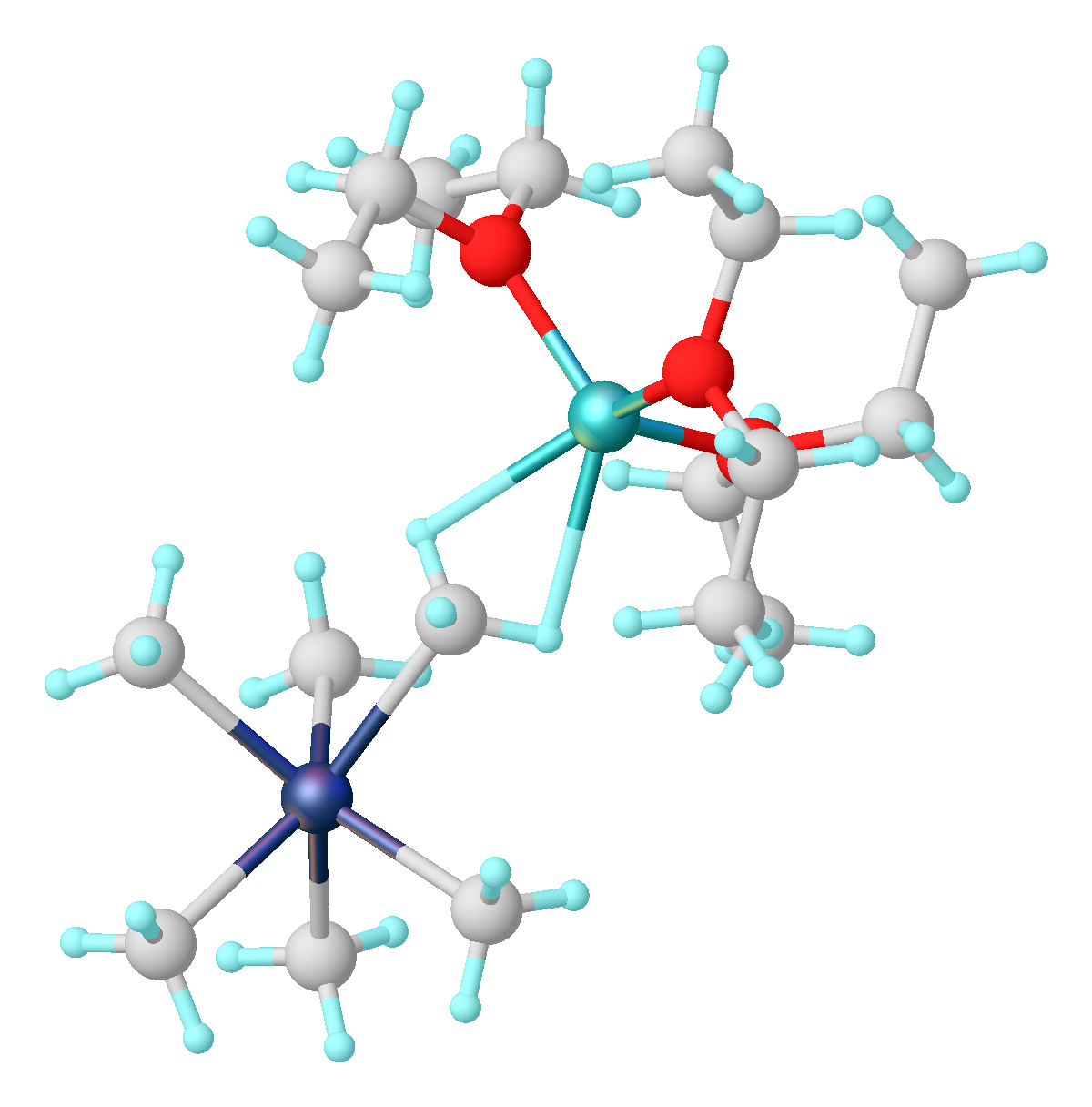
Structure of [Li(OEt_{2})_{3}]^{+}[TaMe_{6}]^{−}.

=== Alkyl and aryl complexes ===
Pentamethyltantalum was reported by Richard Schrock in 1974.

Salts of [Ta(CH_{3})_{6}]^{−} are prepared by alkylation of TaF_{5} using methyl lithium:

TaF_{5} + 6 LiCH_{3} → Li[Ta(CH_{3})_{6}] + 5 LiF

=== Alkylidene complexes ===
Tantalum alkylidene complexes arise by treating trialkyltantalum dichloride with alkyl lithium reagents. This reaction initially forms a thermally unstable tetraalkyl-monochloro-tantalum complex, which undergoes α-hydrogen elimination, followed by alkylation of the remaining chloride.

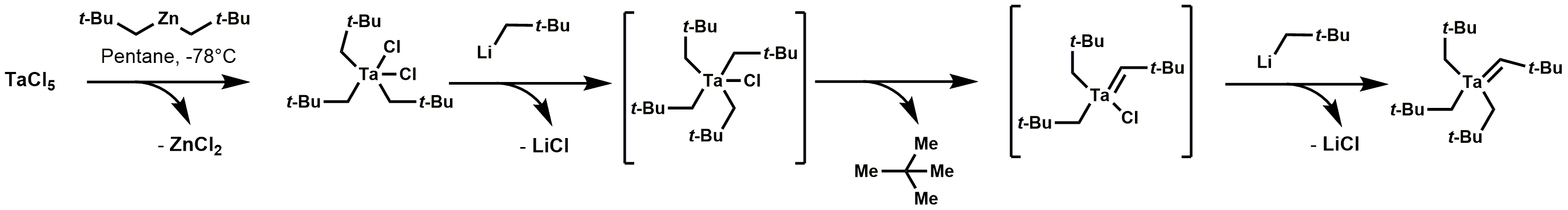
Synthesis of Tantalum Monoalkylidene Complexes

Tantalum alkylidene complexes are nucleophilic. They effect a number of reactions including: olefinations, olefin metathesis, hydroaminoalkylation of olefins, and conjugate allylation of enones.

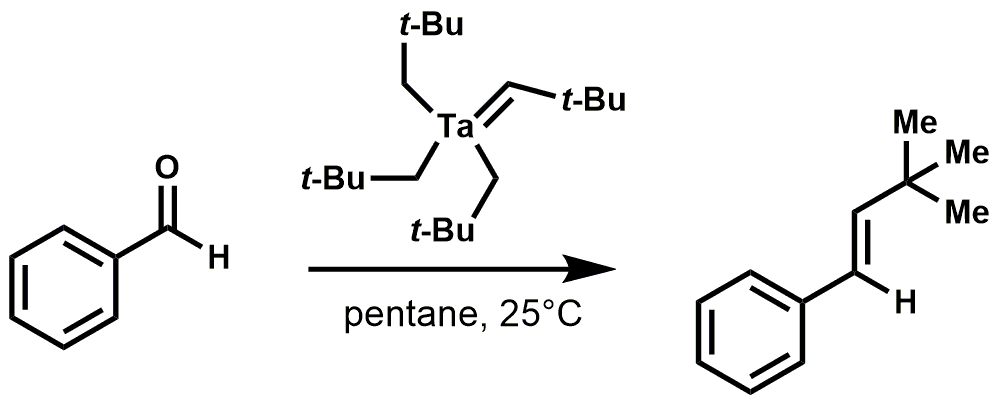
Tantalum Alkylidene Promoted Olefination

Ethylene, propylene, and styrene react with tantalum alkylidene complexes to yield olefin metathesis products.

=== Cyclopentadienyl complexes ===
Some of the first reported organotantalum complexes were cyclopentadienyl derivatives. These arise from the salt metathesis reactions of sodium cyclopentadienide and tantalum pentachloride. An example of this is the first transition metal trihydride, Cp_{2}TaH_{3}. More soluble and better developed are derivatives of pentamethylcyclopentadiene such as Cp*TaCl_{4}, Cp*_{2}TaCl_{2}, and Cp*_{2}TaH_{3}.

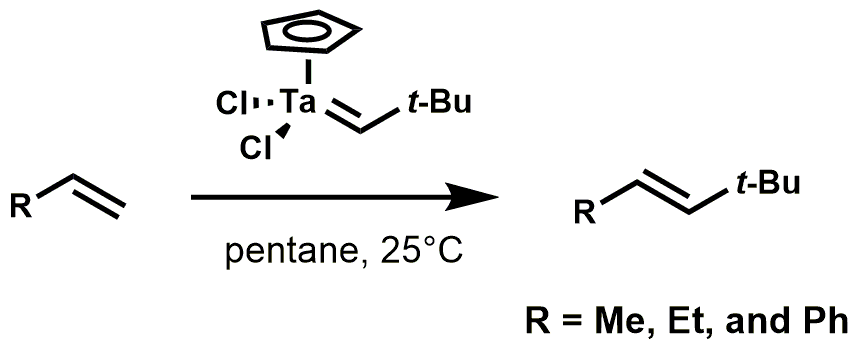
Tantalum Alkylidene Olefin Metathesis

=== Tantalum carbonyls and isocyanides ===
Reduction of TaCl_{5} under an atmosphere of CO gives the salts of [Ta(CO)_{6}]^{−}. These same anions can be obtained by carbonylation of tantalum arene complexes.

A number of tantalum isocyanide complexes are also known.

=== Tantalum arenes and alkyne complexes ===
Treatment of tantalum pentachloride with hexamethylbenzene (C_{6}Me_{6}), aluminium, and aluminium trichloride gives [M(η^{6}-C_{6}Me_{6})AlCl_{4}]_{2}.

Tantalum-alkyne complexes catalyze cyclotrimerizations. Some tantalum-alkyne complexes are precursors to allylic alcohols. Tantalacyclopropenes are invoked as intermediates.

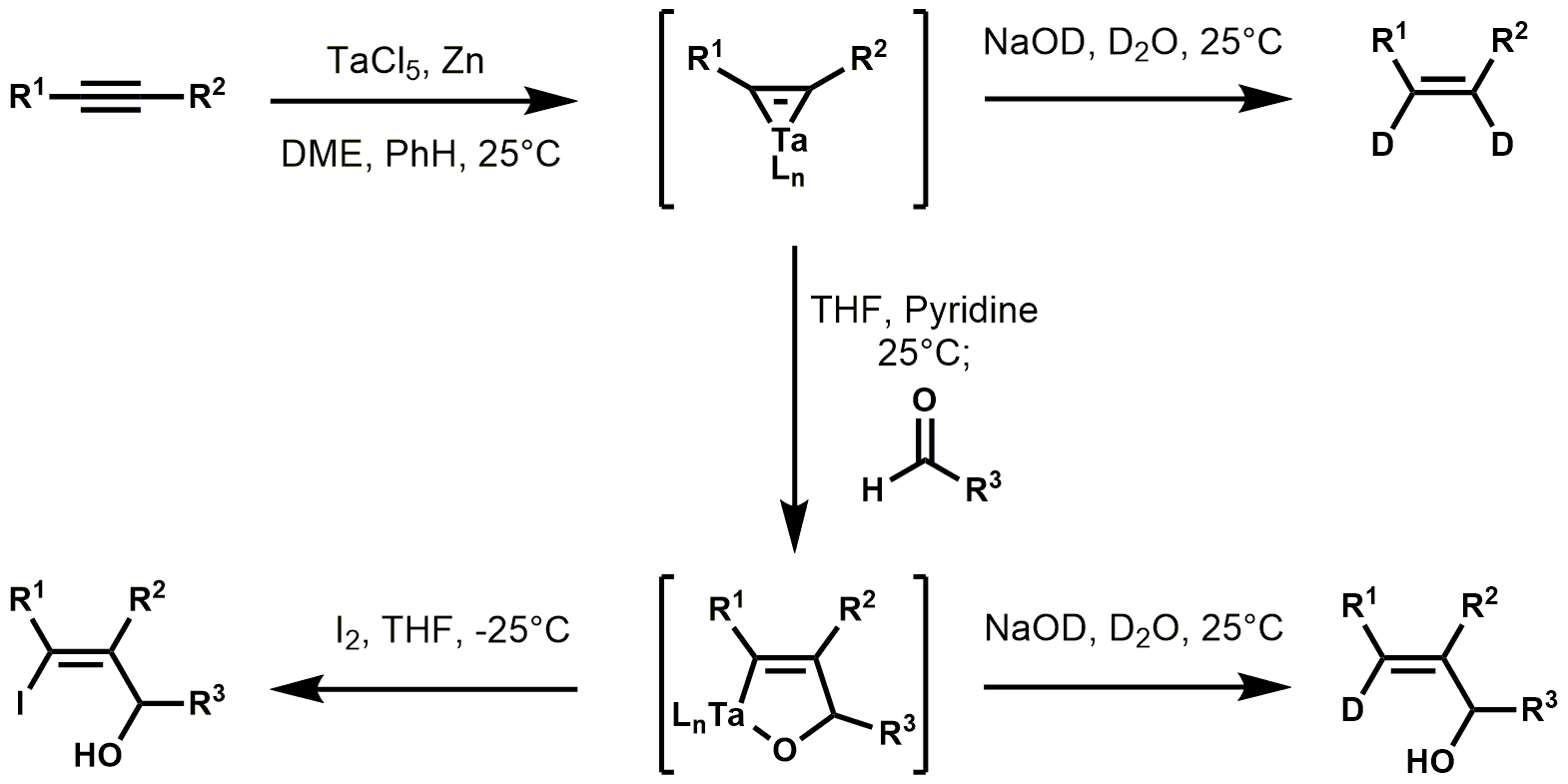
Utimoto's Synthesis of (E)-Allylic Alcohols

=== Tantalum-amido complexes ===
Organotantalum compounds are invoked as intermediates in C-alkylation of secondary amines with 1-alkenes using Ta(NMe_{2})_{5}. The chemistry developed by Maspero was later brought to fruition when Hartwig and Herzon reported the hydroaminoalkylation of olefins to form alkylamines:

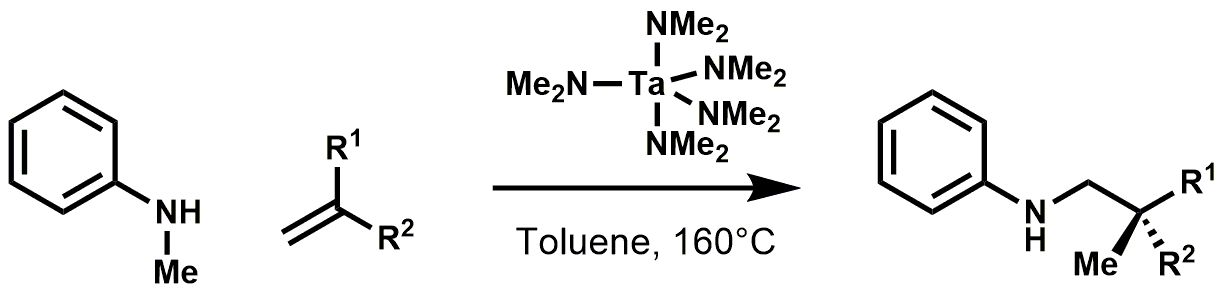
Hartwig hydroaminoalkylation reaction scheme

The catalytic cycle may proceed by β-hydrogen abstraction of the bisamide, which forms the metallaaziridine. Subsequent olefin insertion, protonolysis of the tantalum-carbon bond, and β-hydrogen abstraction affords the alkylamine product.

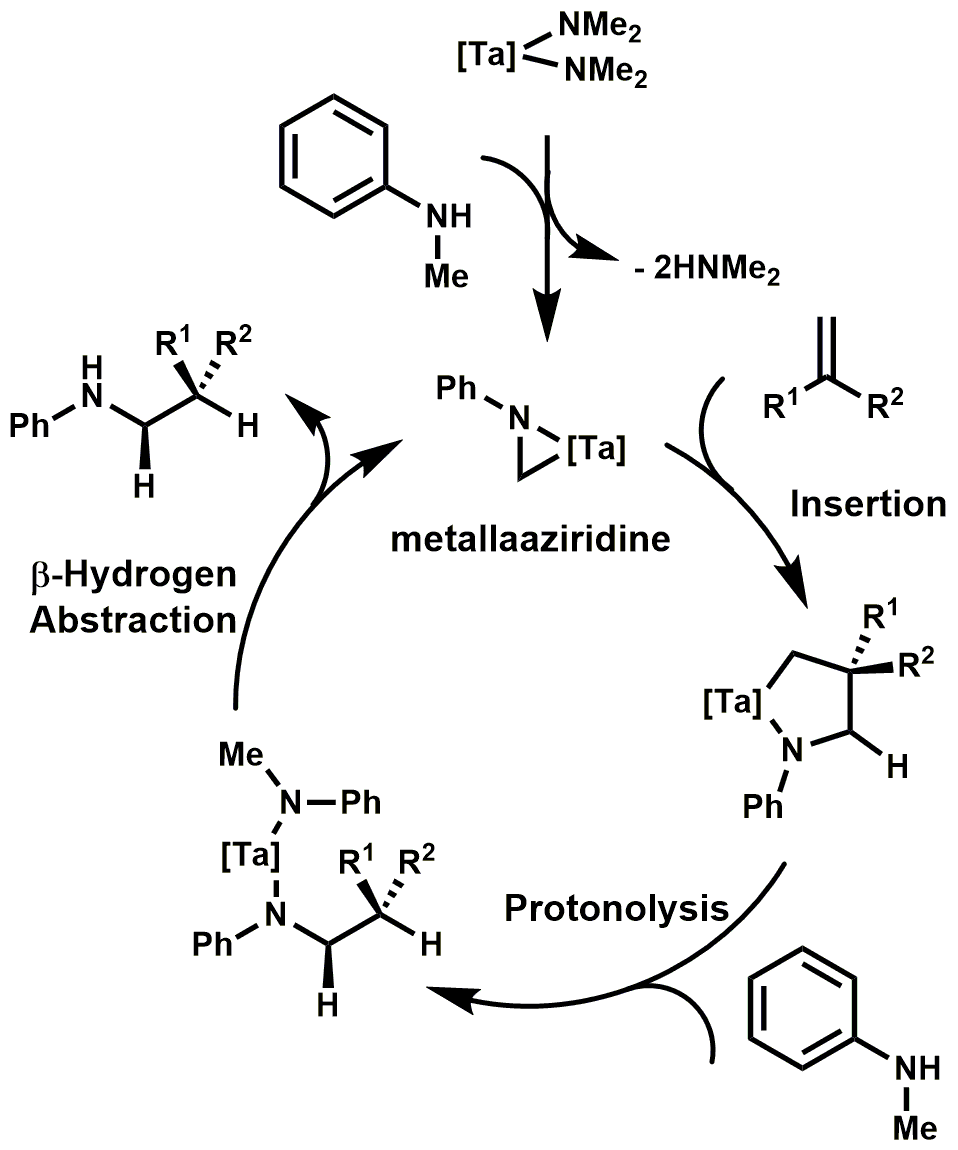
Purposed mechanism of hydroaminoalkylation

=== Transmetalation ===
Organotantalum reagents arise via transmetalation of organotin compounds with tantalum(V) chloride. These organotantalum reagents promote the conjugate allylation of enones. Although the direct allylation of carbonyl groups is prevalent throughout the literature, little has been reported on the conjugate allylation of enones.

== Applications ==
Organotantalum compounds are of academic interest, but few or no commercial applications have been described.
