= Bubble fusion =

Nuclear fusion reaction

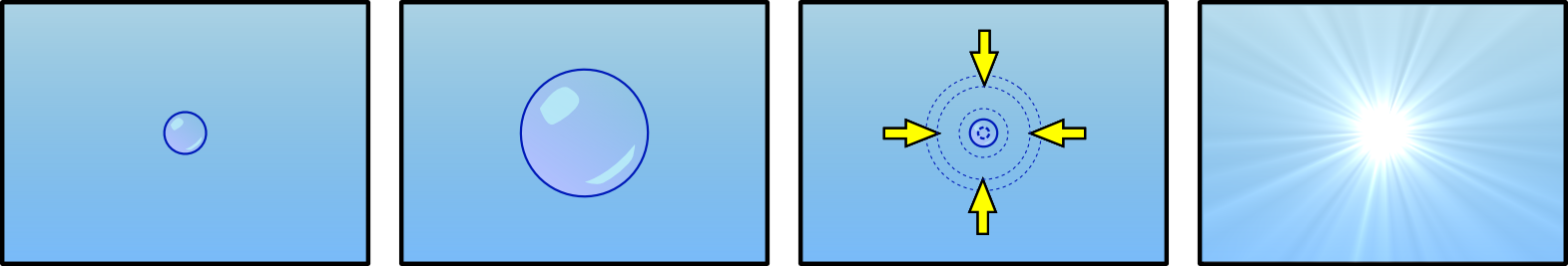
Left to right: formation of bubble; slow expansion; quick and sudden contraction; purported fusion event.

Bubble fusion is the non-technical name for a nuclear fusion reaction hypothesized to occur inside extraordinarily large collapsing gas bubbles created in a liquid during acoustic cavitation. The more technical name is sonofusion.

The term was coined in 2002 with the release of a report by Rusi Taleyarkhan and collaborators that claimed to have observed evidence of sonofusion. The claim was quickly surrounded by controversy, including allegations ranging from experimental error to academic fraud. Subsequent publications claiming independent verification of sonofusion were also highly controversial.

Eventually, an investigation by Purdue University found that Taleyarkhan had engaged in falsification of independent verification, and had included a student as an author on a paper when he had not participated in the research. He was subsequently stripped of his professorship. One of his funders, the Office of Naval Research reviewed the report by Purdue and barred him from federal funding for 28 months.

== Original experiments ==
Sonofusion device used by Rusi Taleyarkhan. 1. Vacuum pump 2. Liquid scintillator 3. Neutron source 4. Acoustic wave generator 5. Test chamber with fluid 6. Microphone 7. Photomultiplier tube 8. Two deuterium atoms collide 8a. Possible fusion event creating Helium and a neutron 8b. Possible fusion event creating Tritium and a proton

US patent 4,333,796, filed by Hugh Flynn in 1978, appears to be the earliest documented reference to a sonofusion-type reaction.

In the March 8, 2002 issue of the peer-reviewed journal Science, Rusi P. Taleyarkhan and colleagues at the Oak Ridge National Laboratory (ORNL) reported that acoustic cavitation experiments conducted with deuterated acetone (C_{3}D_{6}O) showed measurements of tritium and neutron output consistent with the occurrence of fusion. The neutron emission was also reported to be coincident with the sonoluminescence pulse, a key indicator that its source was fusion caused by the heat and pressure inside the collapsing bubbles.

== Oak Ridge failed replication ==
The results were so startling that the Oak Ridge National Laboratory asked two independent researchers, D. Shapira and M. J. Saltmarsh, to repeat the experiment using more sophisticated neutron detection equipment. They reported that the neutron release was consistent with random coincidence. A rebuttal by Taleyarkhan and the other authors of the original report argued that the Shapira and Saltmarsh report failed to account for significant differences in experimental setup, including over an inch of shielding between the neutron detector and the sonoluminescing acetone. According to Taleyarkhan et al., when properly considering those differences, the results were consistent with fusion.

As early as 2002, while experimental work was still in progress, Aaron Galonsky of Michigan State University, in a letter to the journal Science expressed doubts about the claim made by the Taleyarkhan team. In Galonsky's opinion, the observed neutrons were too high in energy to be from a deuterium-deuterium (d-d) fusion reaction. In their response (published on the same page), the Taleyarkhan team provided detailed counter-arguments and concluded that the energy was "reasonably close" to that which was expected from a fusion reaction.

In February 2005 the documentary series Horizon commissioned two leading sonoluminescence researchers, Seth Putterman and Kenneth S. Suslick, to reproduce Taleyarkhan's work. Using similar acoustic parameters, deuterated acetone, similar bubble nucleation, and a much more sophisticated neutron detection device, the researchers could find no evidence of a fusion reaction.

== Subsequent reports of replication ==
In 2004, new reports of bubble fusion were published by the Taleyarkhan group, claiming that the results of previous experiments had been replicated under more stringent experimental conditions. These results differed from the original results in that fusion was claimed to occur over longer times than previously reported. The original report only claimed neutron emission from the initial bubble collapse following bubble nucleation, whereas this report claimed neutron emission many acoustic cycles later.

In July 2005, two of Taleyarkhan's students at Purdue University published evidence confirming the previous result. They used the same acoustic chamber, the same deuterated acetone fluid and a similar bubble nucleation system. In this report, no neutron-sonoluminescence coincidence was attempted. An article in Nature raised issues about the validity of the research and complaints from his Purdue colleagues (see full analysis elsewhere in this page). Charges of misconduct were raised, and Purdue University opened an investigation. It concluded in 2008 that Taleyarkhan's name should have appeared in the author list because of his deep involvement in many steps of the research, that he added one author that had not really participated in the paper just to overcome the criticism of one reviewer, and that this was part of an attempt of "an effort to falsify the scientific record by assertion of independent confirmation". The investigation did not address the validity of the experimental results.

In January 2006, a paper published in the journal Physical Review Letters by Taleyarkhan in collaboration with researchers from Rensselaer Polytechnic Institute reported statistically significant evidence of fusion.

In November 2006, in the midst of accusations concerning Taleyarkhan's research standards, two different scientists visited the meta-stable fluids research lab at Purdue University to measure neutrons, using Taleyarkhan's equipment. Dr. Edward R. Forringer and undergraduates David Robbins and Jonathan Martin of LeTourneau University presented two papers at the American Nuclear Society Winter Meeting that reported replication of neutron emission. Their experimental setup was similar to previous experiments in that it used a mixture of deuterated acetone, deuterated benzene, tetrachloroethylene and uranyl nitrate. Notably, however, it operated without an external neutron source and used two types of neutron detectors. They claimed a liquid scintillation detector measured neutron levels at 8 standard deviations above the background level, while plastic detectors measured levels at 3.8 standard deviations above the background. When the same experiment was performed with non-deuterated control liquid, the measurements were within one standard deviation of background, indicating that the neutron production had only occurred during cavitation of the deuterated liquid. William M. Bugg, emeritus physics professor at the University of Tennessee also traveled to Taleyarkhan's lab to repeat the experiment with his equipment. He also reported neutron emission, using plastic neutron detectors. Taleyarkhan claimed these visits counted as independent replications by experts, but Forringer later recognized that he was not an expert, and Bugg later said that Taleyarkhan performed the experiments and he had only watched.

== Nature report ==
In March 2006, Nature published a special report that called into question the validity of the results of the Purdue experiments. The report quotes Brian Naranjo of the University of California, Los Angeles to the effect that neutron energy spectrum reported in the 2006 paper by Taleyarkhan, et al. was statistically inconsistent with neutrons produced by the proposed fusion reaction and instead highly consistent with neutrons produced by the radioactive decay of Californium 252, an isotope commonly used as a laboratory neutron source.

The response of Taleyarkhan et al., published in Physical Review Letters, attempts to refute Naranjo's hypothesis as to the cause of the neutrons detected.

Tsoukalas, head of the School of Nuclear Engineering at Purdue, and several of his colleagues at Purdue, had convinced Taleyarkhan to move to Purdue and attempt a joint replication. In the 2006 Nature report they detail several troubling issues when trying to collaborate with Taleyarkhan. He reported positive results from certain set of raw data, but his colleagues had also examined that set and it only contained negative results. He never showed his colleagues the raw data corresponding to the positive results, despite several requests. He moved the equipment from a shared laboratory to his own laboratory, thus impeding review by his colleagues, and he did not give any advance warning or explanation for the move. Taleyarkhan convinced his colleagues that they should not publish a paper with their negative results. Taleyarkhan then insisted that the university's press release present his experiment as "peer-reviewed" and "independent", when the co-authors were working in his laboratory under his supervision, and his peers in the faculty were not allowed to review the data. In summary, Taleyarkhan's colleagues at Purdue said he placed obstacles to peer review of his experiments, and they had serious doubts about the validity of the research.

Nature also revealed that the process of anonymous peer-review had not been followed, and that the journal Nuclear Engineering and Design was not independent from the authors. Taleyarkhan was co-editor of the journal, and the paper was only peer-reviewed by his co-editor, with Taleyarkhan's knowledge.

In 2002, Taleyarkhan filed a patent application on behalf of the United States Department of Energy, while working in Oak Ridge. Nature reported that the patent had been rejected in 2005 by the US Patent Office. The examiner called the experiment a variation of discredited cold fusion, found that there was "no reputable evidence of record to support any allegations or claims that the invention is capable of operating as indicated", and found that there was not enough detail for others to replicate the invention. The field of fusion suffered from many flawed claims, thus the examiner asked for additional proof that the radiation was generated from fusion and not from other sources. An appeal was not filed because the Department of Energy had dropped the claim in December 2005.

== Doubts prompt investigation ==
Doubts among Purdue University's Nuclear Engineering faculty as to whether the positive results reported from sonofusion experiments conducted there were truthful prompted the university to initiate a review of the research, conducted by Purdue's Office of the Vice President for Research. In a March 9, 2006 article entitled "Evidence for bubble fusion called into question", Nature interviewed several of Taleyarkhan's colleagues who suspected something was amiss.

On February 7, 2007, the Purdue University administration determined that "the evidence does not support the allegations of research misconduct and that no further investigation of the allegations is warranted". Their report also stated that "vigorous, open debate of the scientific merits of this new technology is the most appropriate focus going forward." In order to verify that the investigation was properly conducted, House Representative Brad Miller requested full copies of its documents and reports by March 30, 2007. His congressional report concluded that "Purdue deviated from its own procedures in investigating this case and did not conduct a thorough investigation"; in response, Purdue announced that it would re-open its investigation.

In June 2008, a multi-institutional team including Taleyarkhan published a paper in Nuclear Engineering and Design to "clear up misconceptions generated by a webposting of UCLA which served as the basis for the Nature article of March 2006", according to a press release.

On July 18, 2008, Purdue University announced that a committee with members from five institutions had investigated 12 allegations of research misconduct against Rusi Taleyarkhan. It concluded that two allegations were founded—that Taleyarkhan had claimed independent confirmation of his work when in reality the apparent confirmations were done by Taleyarkhan's former students and was not as "independent" as Taleyarkhan implied, and that Taleyarkhan had included a colleague's name on one of his papers who had not actually been involved in the research ("the sole apparent motivation for the addition of Mr. Bugg was a desire to overcome a reviewer's criticism", the report concluded).

Taleyarkhan's appeal of the report's conclusions was rejected. He said the two allegations of misconduct were trivial administrative issues and had nothing to do with the discovery of bubble nuclear fusion or the underlying science, and that "all allegations of fraud and fabrication have been dismissed as invalid and without merit — thereby supporting the underlying science and experimental data as being on solid ground". A researcher questioned by the LA Times said that the report had not clarified whether bubble fusion was real or not, but that the low quality of the papers and the doubts cast by the report had destroyed Taleyarkhan's credibility with the scientific community.

On August 27, 2008, he was stripped of his named Arden Bement Jr. Professorship, and forbidden to be a thesis advisor for graduate students for at least the next 3 years.

Despite the findings against him, Taleyarkhan received a $185,000 grant from the National Science Foundation between September 2008 and August 2009 to investigate bubble fusion. In 2009 the Office of Naval Research debarred him for 28 months, until September 2011, from receiving U.S. Federal Funding. During that period his name was listed in the 'Excluded Parties List' to prevent him from receiving further grants from any government agency.

== See also ==
- Cold fusion
- List of energy topics
- Mechanism of sonoluminescence
