= Mechanism of sonoluminescence =

Sonoluminescence is a phenomenon that occurs when a small gas bubble is acoustically suspended and periodically driven in a liquid solution at ultrasonic frequencies, resulting in bubble collapse, cavitation, and light emission. The thermal energy that is released from the bubble collapse is so great that it can cause weak light emission. The mechanism of the light emission remains uncertain, but some of the current theories, which are categorized under either thermal or electrical processes, are Bremsstrahlung radiation, argon rectification hypothesis, and hot spot. Some researchers are beginning to favor thermal process explanations as temperature differences have consistently been observed with different methods of spectral analysis. In order to understand the light emission mechanism, it is important to know what is happening in the bubble's interior and at the bubble's surface.

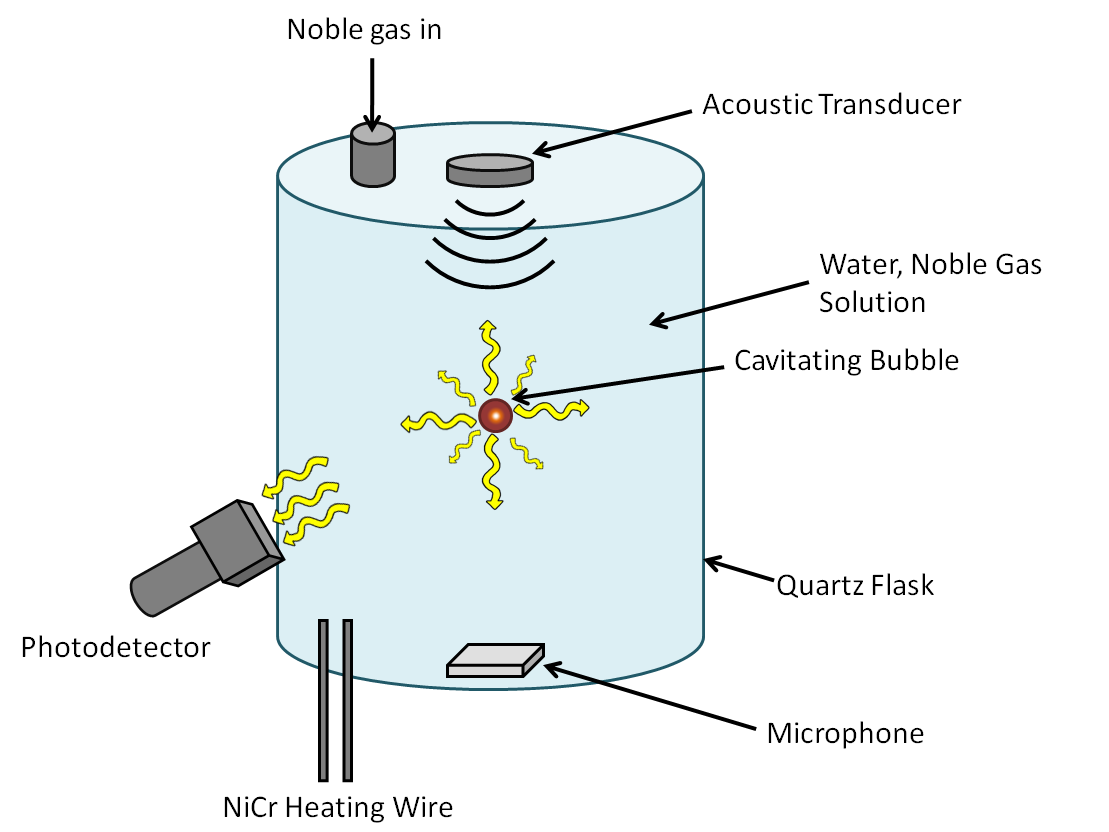
A setup similar to the following is required to create a bubble that can sonoluminesce.

== Current competing theories ==
Prior to the early 1990s, the studies on different chemical and physical variables of sonoluminescence were all conducted using multi-bubble sonoluminescence (MBSL). This was a problem since all of the theories and bubble dynamics were based on single bubble sonoluminescence (SBSL) and researchers believed that the bubble oscillations of neighboring bubbles could affect each other. Single bubble sonoluminescence wasn't achieved until the early 1990s and allowed the study of the effects of various parameters on a single cavitating bubble. After many of the early theories were disproved, the remaining plausible theories can be classified into two different processes: electrical and thermal.

=== Single-bubble sonoluminescence (SBSL) ===
SBSL emits more light than MBSL due to fewer interactions between neighboring bubbles. Another advantage for SBSL is that a single bubble collapses without being affected by other surrounding bubbles, allowing more accurate studies on acoustic cavitation and sonoluminescence theories. Some exotic theories have been made, for example from Schwinger in 1992 who hinted the dynamical Casimir effect as a potential photon-emission process. Several theories say that the location of light emission is in the liquid instead of inside the bubble. Other SBSL theories explain that the emission of photons due to the high temperatures in the bubble are analogical to the hot spot theories of MBSL. Regarding the thermal emission a large variety of different processes are prevalent. Because temperatures are increasing from several hundred to many thousand kelvin during collapse, the processes can be molecular recombination, collision-induced emission, molecular emission, excimers, atomic recombination, radiative attachments of ions, neutral and ion Bremsstrahlung, or emission from confined electrons in voids. Which of these theories applies depends on accurate measurements and calculations of the temperature inside the bubble.

=== Multi-bubble sonoluminescence (MBSL) ===
Unlike single-bubble sonoluminescence, multi-bubble sonoluminescence is the creation of many oscillating and collapsing bubbles. Typically in MBSL, the light emission from each individual bubble is weaker than in SBSL because the neighboring bubbles can interact and affect each other. Because neighboring bubbles can interact with each other, it makes it more difficult to produce accurate studies and to characterize the properties of an individual collapsing bubble.

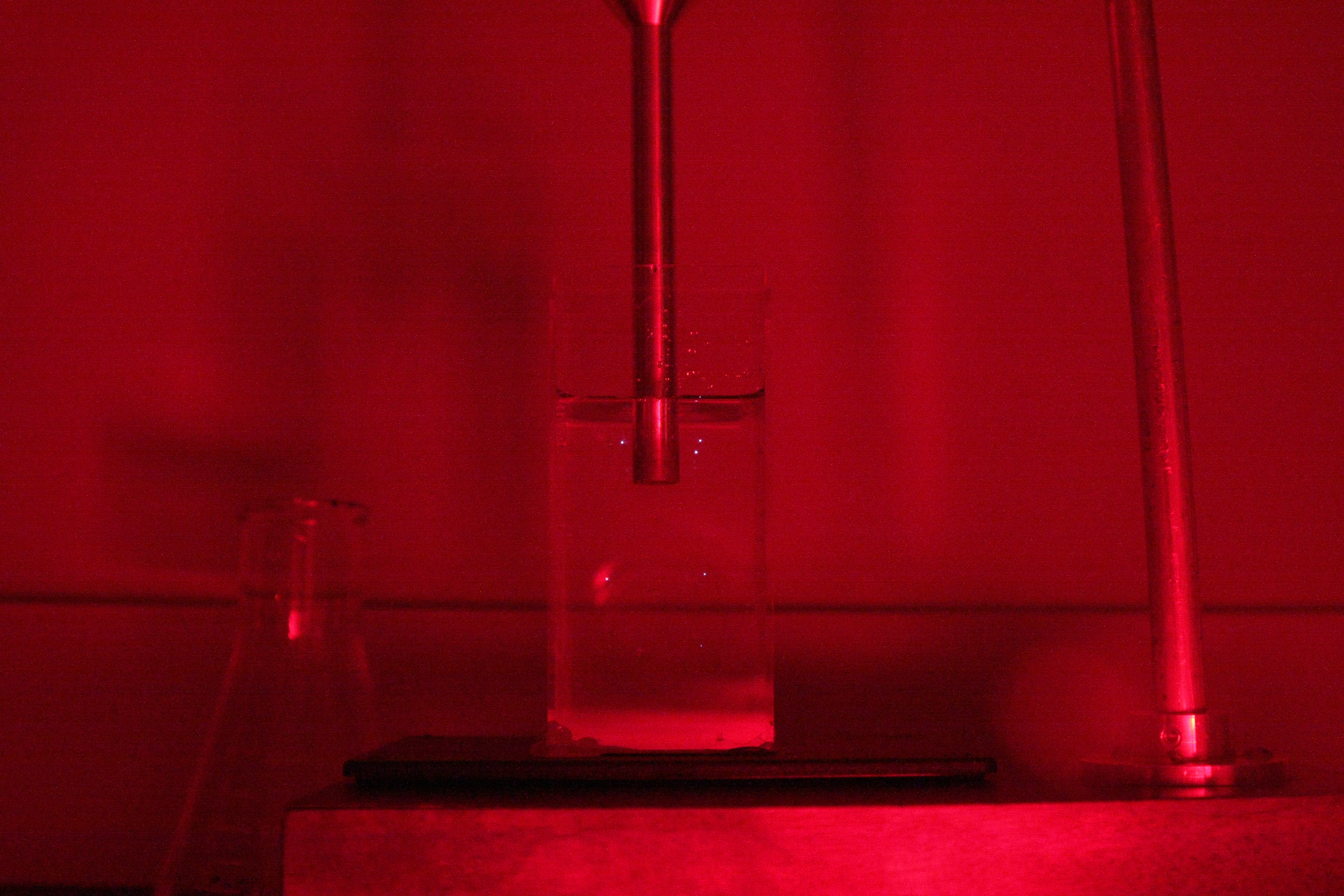
Multi-bubble sonoluminescence creates many oscillating and collapsing bubbles that will emit light. Typically the light emission is weaker than with single-bubble sonoluminescence. The bright blue dots, which are viewable when the image is viewed at high resolution are the sonoluminescencing bubbles.

== Bubble interior ==
One of the greatest obstacles in sonoluminescence research has been trying to obtain measurements of the interior of the bubble. Most measurements, like temperature and pressure, are indirectly measured using models and bubble dynamics.

=== Temperature ===
Some of the developed theories about the mechanism of SBSL result in prognoses for the peak temperature from 6000 K to 20,000 K. What they all have in common is, a) the interior of the bubble heats up and becomes at least as hot as that measured for MBSL, b) water vapor is the main temperature-limiting factor and c) the averaged temperature over the bubble does not rise higher than 10,000 K.

== Bubble dynamics ==
These equations were made using five major assumptions, with four of them being common to all the equations:

1. The bubble remains spherical
2. The bubble contents obey the ideal gas law
3. The internal pressure remains uniform throughout the bubble
4. No evaporation or condensation occurs inside the bubble

The fifth assumption, which changes between each formulation, pertains to the thermodynamic behavior of the liquid surrounding the bubble. These assumptions severely limit the models when the pulsations are large and the wall velocities reach the speed of sound.

=== Keller–Miksis formulation ===
The Keller–Miksis formulation is an equation derived for the large, radial oscillations of a bubble trapped in a sound field. When the frequency of the sound field approaches the natural frequency of the bubble, it will result in large amplitude oscillations. The Keller–Miksis equation takes into account the viscosity, surface tension, incident sound wave, and acoustic radiation coming from the bubble, which was previously unaccounted for in Lauterborn's calculations. Lauterborn solved the equation that Plesset, et al. modified from Rayleigh's original analysis of large oscillating bubbles. Keller and Miksis obtained the following formula:

$$\left ( 1 - \frac{\dot{R}}{c} \right ) R \ddot{R} + \frac{3}{2} \dot{R^2} \left ( 1 - \frac{\dot{R}}{3c} \right ) = \left ( 1 + \frac{\dot{R}}{c} \right ) \frac{1}{\rho_l} \left [ p_B(R,t) - p_A\left(t + \frac{R}{c}\right) - P_\infty \right ] + \frac{R dp_B(R,t)}{\rho_l c dt}$$

where $R$ is the radius of the bubble, the dots indicate first and second time derivatives, $\rho_l$ is the density of the liquid, $c$ is the speed of sound through the liquid, $p_B(R,t)$ is the pressure on the liquid side of the bubble's interface, $t$ is time, and $p_A(t+R/c)$ is the time-delayed driving pressure.

=== Prosperetti formulation ===
Prosperetti found a way to accurately determine the internal pressure of the bubble using the following equation.

$$\dot{p} = \frac{3}{r} \left ( (\gamma - 1) K \frac {\partial T}{\partial r}\Bigg|_R - \gamma p \dot{R} \right )$$

where $T$ is the temperature, $K$ is the thermal conductivity of the gas, and $r$ is the radial distance.

=== Flynn's formulation ===
This formulation allows the study of the motions and the effects of heat conduction, shear viscosity, compressibility, and surface tension on small cavitation bubbles in liquids that are set into motion by an acoustic pressure field. The effect of vapor pressure on the cavitation bubble can also be determined using the interfacial temperature. The formulation is specifically designed to describe the motion of a bubble that expands to a maximum radius and then violently collapses or contracts. This set of equations was solved using an improved Euler method.

$$\left ( 1 - \frac{\dot{R}}{c} \right ) R \ddot{R} + \frac{3}{2} \dot{R^2} \left ( 1 - \frac{\dot{R}}{3c} \right ) = \left ( 1 + \frac{\dot{R}}{c} \right ) \frac{1}{\rho_l} \left [ p_B(R,t) - p_A(t) - P_\infty \right ] + \frac{R}{\rho_l c} \left ( 1 - \frac{\dot{R}}{c} \right ) \frac{dp_B(R,t)}{dt}$$

where $R$ is the radius of the bubble, the dots indicate first and second time derivatives, $\rho_l$ is the density of the liquid, $c$ is the speed of sound through the liquid, $dp_B(R,t)$ is the pressure on the liquid side of the bubble's interface, $t$ is time, and $p_A(t)$ is the driving pressure.

=== Rayleigh–Plesset equation ===
The theory of bubble dynamics was started in 1917 by Lord Rayleigh during his work with the Royal Navy to investigate cavitation damage on ship propellers. Over several decades his work was refined and developed by Milton Plesset, Andrea Prosperetti, and others. The Rayleigh–Plesset equation is:

$$R \ddot{R} + \frac{3}{2} \dot{R^2} = \frac{1}{\rho_l} \left ( p_g - P_0 - P \left ( t \right ) - 4\mu \frac{\dot{R}}{R} - \frac{2\gamma}{R} \right )$$

where $R$ is the bubble radius, $\ddot{R}$ is the second order derivative of the bubble radius with respect to time, $\dot{R}$ is the first order derivative of the bubble radius with respect to time, $\rho_l$ is the density of the liquid, $p_g$ is the pressure in the gas (which is assumed to be uniform), $P_0$ is the background static pressure, $P(t)$ is the sinusoidal driving pressure, $\mu$ is the viscosity of the liquid, and $\gamma$ is the surface tension of the gas-liquid interface.

== Bubble surface ==
The surface of a collapsing bubble like those seen in both SBSL and MBSL serves as a boundary layer between the liquid and vapor phases of the solution.

=== Generation ===
MBSL has been observed in many different solutions under a variety of conditions. Unfortunately it is more difficult to study as the bubble cloud is uneven and can contain a wide range of pressures and temperatures. SBSL is easier to study due to the predictable nature of the bubble. This bubble is sustained in a standing acoustic wave of moderate pressure, approximately 1.5 atm. Since cavitation does not normally occur at these pressures the bubble may be seeded through several techniques:

1. Transient boiling through short current pulse in nichrome wire.
2. A small jet of water perturbs the surface to introduce air bubbles.
3. A rapidly formed vapor cavity via focused laser pulse.

The standing acoustic wave, which contains pressure antinodes at the center of the containment vessel, causes the bubbles to quickly coalesce into a single radially oscillating bubble.

=== Collapse ===
Once a single bubble is stabilized in the pressure antinode of the standing wave, it can be made to emit pulses of light by driving the bubble into highly nonlinear oscillations. This is done by the acoustic wave increasing the surrounding pressure to disrupt the steady, linear growth of the bubble. This causes the bubble to collapse in a runaway reaction that reverts once the high pressures inside the bubble at its minimum radius cause it to expand again.

=== Afterbounces ===
The collapsed bubble expands due to high internal pressure and experiences a diminishing effect until the high pressure antinode returns to the center of the vessel. The bubble continues to occupy more or less the same space due to the acoustic radiation force, the Bjerknes force, and the buoyancy force of the bubble.

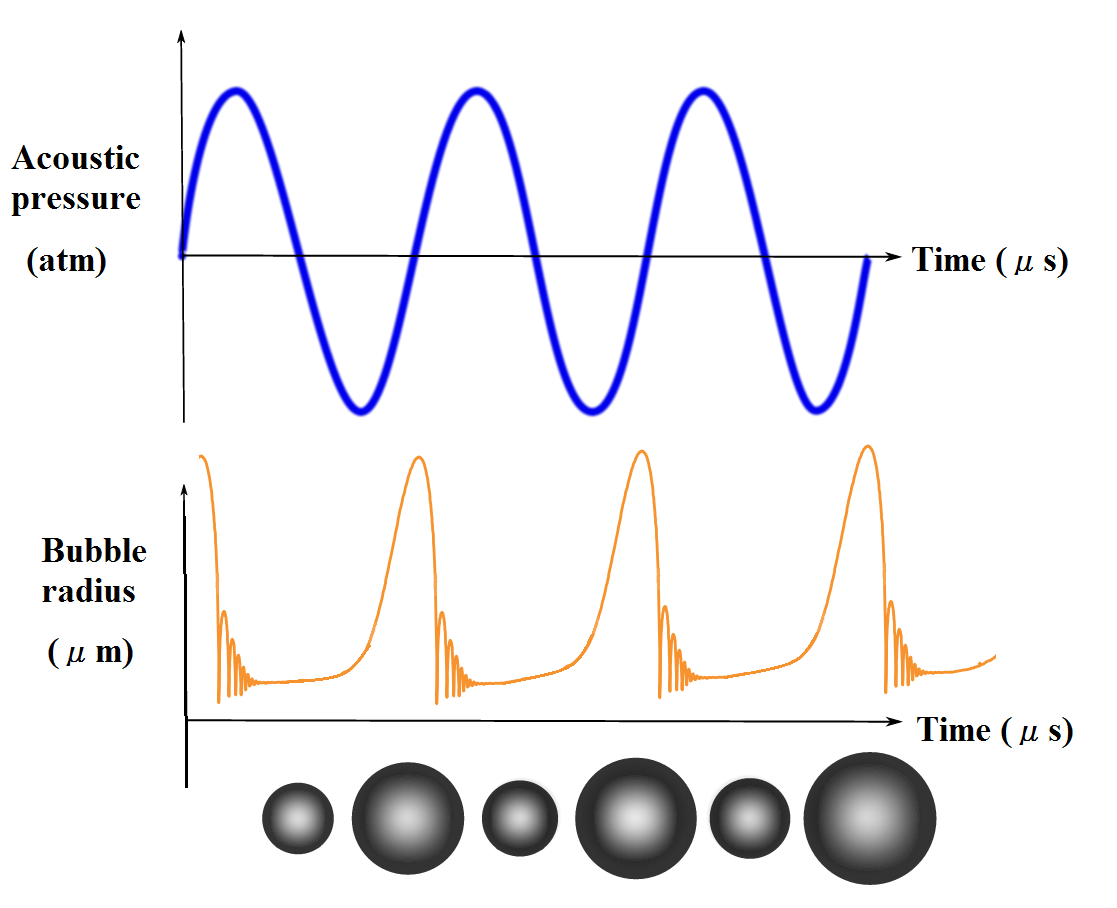
Bubble oscillations correspond to pressure anti-nodes

=== Surface chemistry ===
The effect that different chemicals present in solution have to the velocity of the collapsing bubble has recently been studied. Nonvolatile liquids such as sulfuric and phosphoric acid have been shown to produce flashes of light several nanoseconds in duration with a much slower bubble wall velocity, and producing several thousand-fold greater light emission. This effect is probably masked in SBSL in aqueous solutions by the absorption of light by water molecules and contaminants.

==== Surface tension ====
It can be inferred from these results that the difference in surface tension between these different compounds is the source of different spectra emitted and the time scales in which emission occur.

== Light emission ==
The inertia of a collapsing bubble generates high pressures and temperatures capable of ionizing a small fraction of the noble gas within the volume of the bubble. This small fraction of ionized gas is transparent and allows for volume emission to be detected. Free electrons from the ionized noble gas begin to interact with other neutral atoms causing thermal bremsstrahlung radiation. Surface emission emits a more intense flash of light with a longer duration and is dependent on wavelength. Experimental data suggest that only volume emission occurs in the case of sonoluminescence. As the sound wave reaches a low energy trough, the bubble expands and electrons are able to recombine with free ions and halt light emission. Light pulse time is dependent on the ionization energy of the noble gas with argon having a light pulse of 160 picoseconds.

Radiance (W/nm)	Relative brightness
1.50×10^{−12}	Bright
9.00×10^{−13}	Semi-bright
1.75×10^{−13}	Dim
7.00×10^{−14}	Very dim
2.00×10^{−14}	Extremely dim

Solution type	Average max. radiance (W/nm)
Xenon in water	1.04×10^{−9}
Krypton in water	8.00×10^{−10}
Argon in water	7.75×10^{−10}
Neon in water	5.40×10^{−10}
Helium in water	4.45×10^{−11}
^{3}He in water	3.60×10^{−11}

=== Electrical processes ===
In 1937, the explanations for the light emission have favored electrical discharges. The first ideas have been about the charge separation in cavitation bubbles, which have been seen as spherical capacitors with charges at the center and the wall. At the collapse, the capacitance decreases and voltage increases until electric breakdown occurs. A further suggestion was a charge separation by enhancing charge fluctuations on the bubble wall, however, a breakdown should take place during the expansion phase of the bubble dynamics. These discharge theories have to assume that the emitting bubble undergoes an asymmetric collapse, because a symmetric charge distribution cannot radiate light.

=== Thermal processes ===
Because the bubble collapse occurs within microseconds, the hot spot theory states that the thermal energy results from an adiabatic bubble collapse. In 1950 it was assumed that the bubble internal temperatures were as high as 10,000 K at the collapse of a spherical symmetric bubble. In the 1990s, sonoluminescence spectra were used by Suslick to measure effective emission temperatures in bubble clouds (multibubble sonoluminescence) of 5000 K, and more recently temperatures as high as 20,000 K in single bubble cavitation.

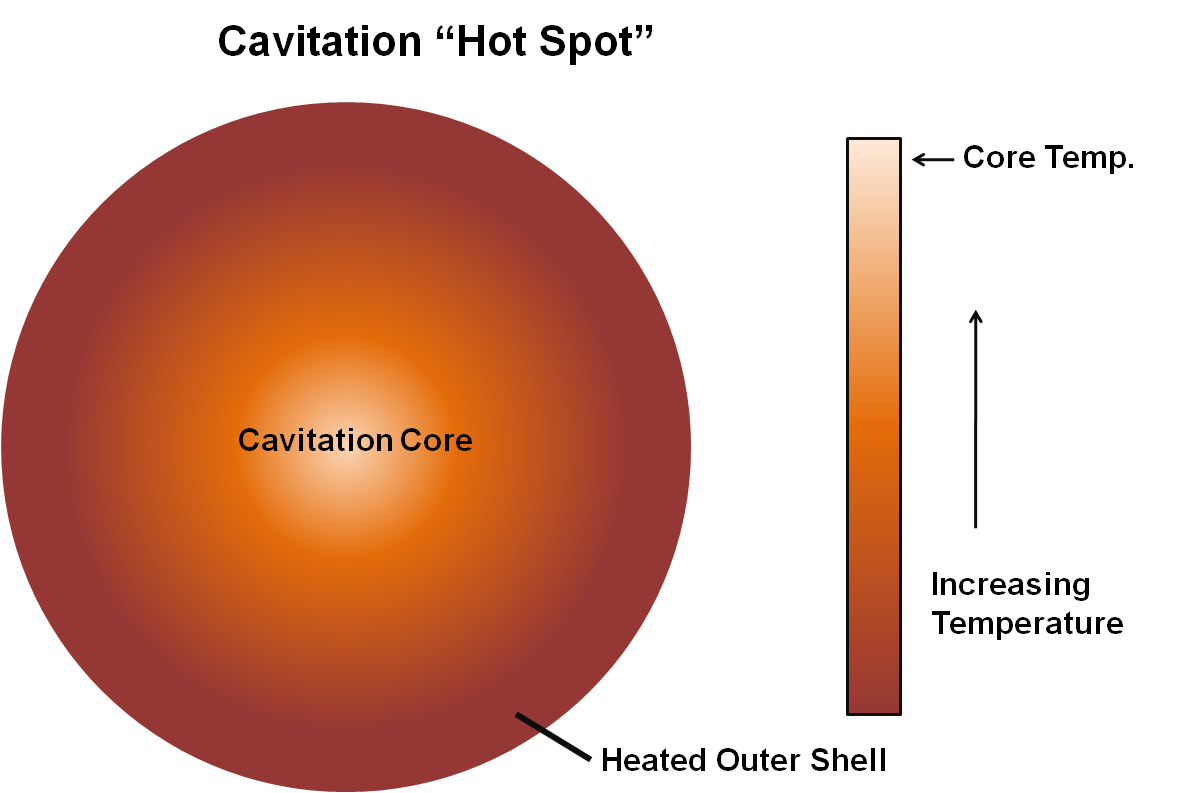
Upon the collapse of a bubble experiencing cavitation, a hot spot is produced for a small amount of time. That hot spot contains a high temperature core that is surrounded by a cooler outer shell.

== Bubble shape stability ==
The limit for the ambient size of the bubble is set by the appearance of instabilities in the shape of the oscillating bubble. The shape stability thresholds depend on changes in the radial dynamics, caused by different liquid viscosities or driving frequencies. If the frequency is decreased, the parametric instability is suppressed as the stabilizing influence of viscosity can appear longer to suppress perturbations. However, the collapses of low-frequency-driven bubbles favor an earlier onset of the Rayleigh-Taylor instability. Larger bubbles can be stabilized to show sonoluminescence when not too high forcing pressures are applied. At low-frequency the water vapor becomes more important. The bubbles can be stabilized by cooling the fluid, whereas more light is emitted.

== See also ==
- Bubble fusion
