= Deuterated benzene =

Kekulé, skeletal formula of deuterated benzene
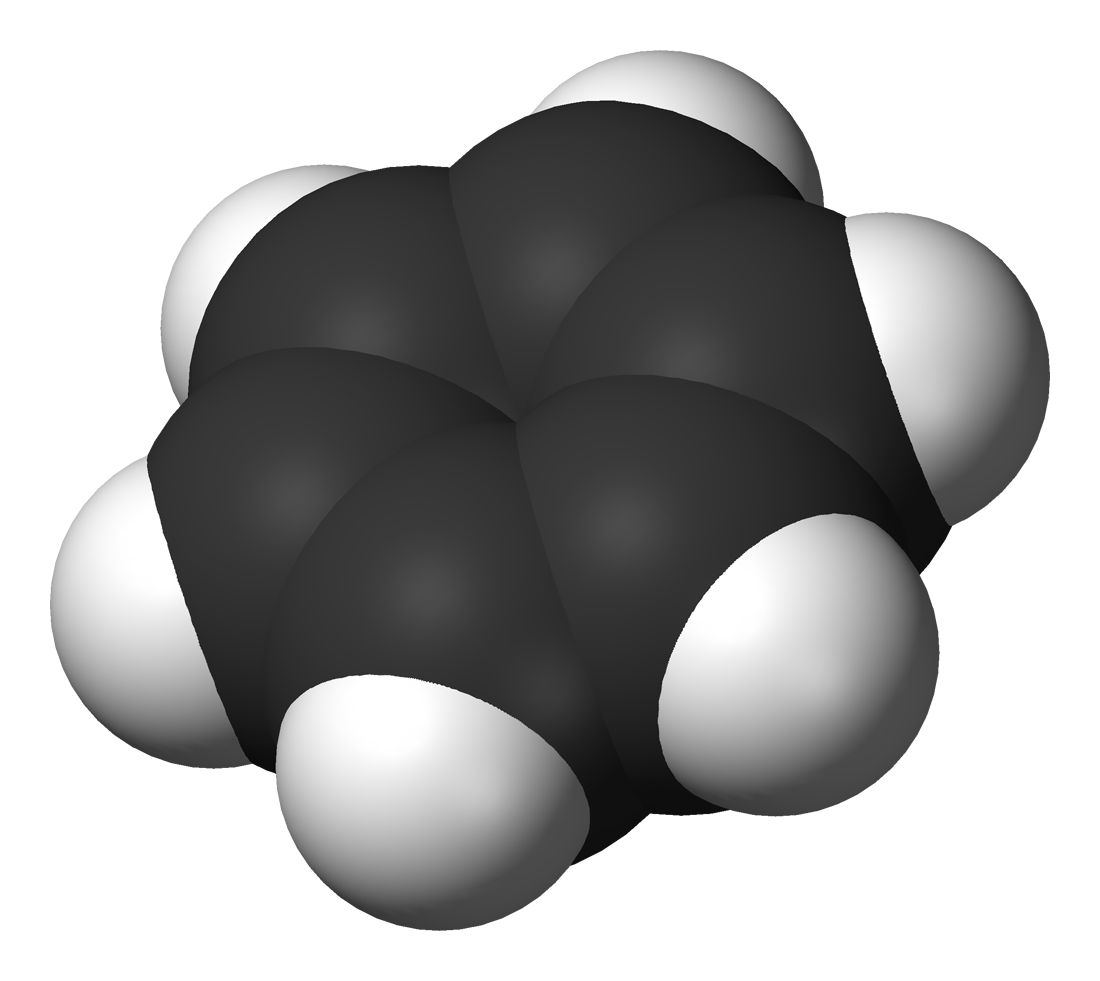
Spacefill model of deuterated benzene
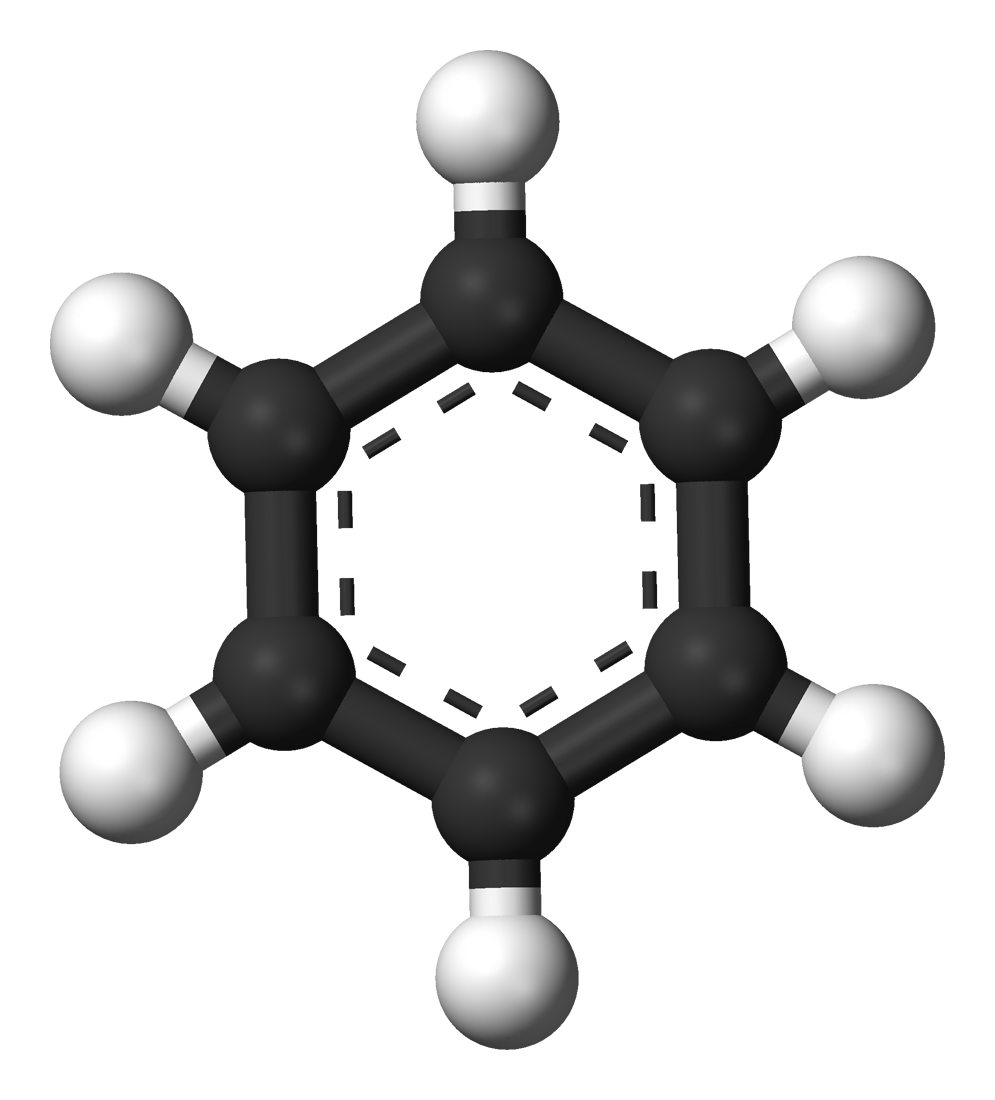
- Ball and stick model of deuterated benzene

Names
- Preferred IUPAC name (^{2}H_{6})Benzene

Identifiers
CAS Number	1076-43-3
3D model (JSmol)	Interactive image
Beilstein Reference	1905426
ChEBI	CHEBI:193039
ChemSpider	64671
ECHA InfoCard	100.012.784
EC Number	214-061-8
PubChem CID	71601
UN number	1114
CompTox Dashboard (EPA)	DTXSID7037769
- InChI: InChI=1S/C6H6/c1-2-4-6-5-3-1/h1-6H/i1D,2D,3D,4D,5D,6D Key: UHOVQNZJYSORNB-MZWXYZOWSA-N
- SMILES: [2H]c1c([2H])c([2H])c([2H])c([2H])c1[2H]

Properties
Chemical formula	C_{6}^{2}H_{6} or C_{6}D_{6}
Molar mass	84.1488 g·mol^{−1}
Density	0.950 g cm^{−3}
Melting point	7 °C; 44 °F; 280 K
Boiling point	79 °C; 174 °F; 352 K

Thermochemistry
Heat capacity (C)	152.46 J K^{−1} mol^{−1}

Hazards
- GHS labelling
Pictograms	(GHS05: Corrosive) (GHS07: Exclamation mark) (GHS08: Health hazard)
Signal word	Danger
Hazard statements	H225, H304, H315, H319, H340, H350, H372
Precautionary statements	P201, P202, P210, P233, P240, P241, P242, P243, P260, P264, P270, P280, P281, P301+P310, P302+P352, P303+P361+P353, P305+P351+P338, P308+P313, P314, P321, P331, P332+P313, P337+P313, P362, P370+P378, P403+P235, P405, P501
NFPA 704 (fire diamond)	2 3 0
Flash point	−11 °C (12 °F; 262 K)

Related compounds
Related compounds	Benzene
- Except where otherwise noted, data are given for materials in their standard state (at 25 °C [77 °F], 100 kPa). verify (what is ?) Infobox references

Deuterated benzene (C_{6}D_{6}) is an isotopologue of benzene (C_{6}H_{6}) in which the hydrogen atom ("H") is replaced with deuterium (heavy hydrogen) isotope ("D").

== Properties ==
The properties of deuterated benzene are very similar to those of normal benzene, however, the increased atomic weight of deuterium relative to protium means that the melting point of C_{6}D_{6} is about 1.3 °C higher than that of the nondeuterated analogue. The boiling points of both compounds, however, are the same: 80 °C.

== Applications ==
Deuterated benzene is a common solvent used in NMR spectroscopy. It is widely used for taking spectra of organometallic compounds, which often react with the cheaper deuterated chloroform.

A slightly more exotic application of C_{6}D_{6} is in the synthesis of molecules containing a deuterated phenyl group. Deuterated benzene will undergo all the same reactions its normal analogue will, just a little more slowly due to the kinetic isotope effect. For example, deuterated benzene could be used in the synthesis of deuterated benzoic acid, if desired:

Many simple monosubstituted aromatic compounds bearing the deuterated phenyl (C_{6}D_{5}) group may be purchased commercially, such as aniline, acetophenone, nitrobenzene, bromobenzene, and more.
