= Rusi Taleyarkhan =

Nuclear engineer and academic fraudster

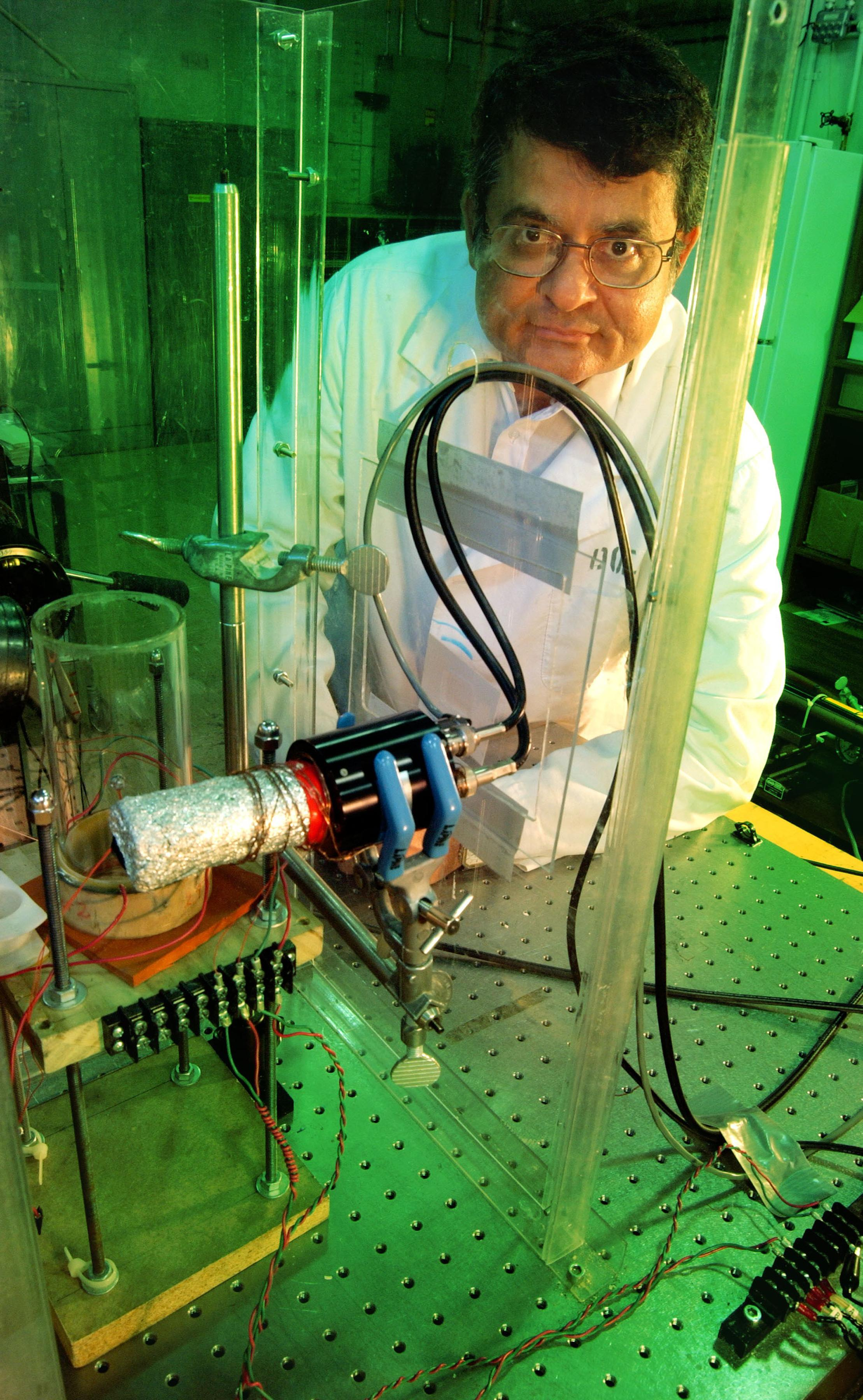
Professor Rusi Taleyarkhan at Oak Ridge, showing a bubble fusion system

Rusi P. Taleyarkhan is a nuclear engineer and has been a faculty member in the Department of Nuclear Engineering at Purdue University since 2003. Prior to that, he was on staff at the Oak Ridge National Laboratory (ORNL) in Oak Ridge, Tennessee. He obtained his Bachelor of Technology degree in mechanical engineering from the Indian Institute of Technology, Madras in 1977 and MS and PhD (Nuclear Engineering and Science) degrees from Rensselaer Polytechnic Institute (RPI) in 1978 and 1982 respectively. He also holds an MBA (Business Administration) from RPI.

In 2008, he was judged guilty of research misconduct for "falsification of the research record" by a Purdue review board.

== Sonofusion work and controversy ==
Sonofusion device used by Rusi Taleyarkhan. 1. Vacuum pump 2. Liquid scintillator 3. Neutron source 4. Acoustic wave generator 5. Test chamber with fluid 6. Microphone 7. Photomultiplier tube 8. Two deuterium atoms collide 8a. Possible fusion event creating Helium and a neutron 8b. Possible fusion event creating Tritium and a proton

In 2002, while a senior scientist at ORNL, Taleyarkhan published a paper on fusion achieved by bombarding a container of liquid solvent with strong ultrasonic vibrations, a process known as sonofusion or bubble fusion. In theory, the vibrations collapsed gas bubbles in the solvent, heating them to temperatures high enough to fuse hydrogen atoms and release energy. Following his move from Oak Ridge to Purdue in 2003, Taleyarkhan published additional papers about his research in this area.

Numerous other scientists, however, were not able to replicate Taleyarkhan's work, including in published articles in Physical Review Letters from the University of Göttingen, from UCLA, from University of Illinois, from former colleagues at Oak Ridge National Labs, and a study funded by the Office of Naval Research in the University of California.

Taleyarkhan's results were reportedly repeated by Edward Forringer of LeTourneau University in Taleyarkhan's own labs at Purdue in November 2006. Purdue decided at that time not to further investigate the initial narrowly defined charges of misconduct against Taleyarkhan made by other members of the Purdue Faculty.

The Chronicle of Higher Education, however, has noted some problems with the verification. "During this time, Dr. Taleyarkhan says, two more scientists came into his laboratory and independently verified bubble fusion. Dr. Taleyarkhan contends that both were experts and did their work independently of him. But in interviews, both researchers contradict aspects of that account. One of those scientists, Edward R. Forringer, a professor of physics at LeTourneau University, in Texas, says he is certainly not an expert. Nonetheless, he says he is confident that his results do support the reality of bubble fusion."

On May 10, 2007, Purdue announced that they would add at least one scientist without ties to the university to a new inquiry of Taleyarkhan and his work, at the insistence of a Congressional panel investigating the use of federal funds in attempts to reproduce Taleyarkhan's results. The panel cited concerns that Taleyarkhan's claims of independent verification were "highly doubtful", and criticized Purdue for using three of the same members of an earlier inquiry committee in their recently completed review. Taleyarkhan called the report a "one-sided, grossly exaggerated write-up" but agreed to cooperate. On September 10, 2007, Purdue reported that its internal committee had determined that "several matters merit further investigation" and that they were re-opening formal proceedings.

This board judged him guilty of "research misconduct" for "falsification of the research record" in July 2008 and on August 27, 2008, his status as a member of the Purdue University Graduate Faculty was limited to that of 'Special Graduate Faculty.' He was permitted to serve on graduate committees, but would not be able to serve as a major professor or co-major professor for graduate students for a period of three years. Taleyarkhan received from September 2008 to August 2009 a $185,000 grant from the National Science Foundation to investigate bubble fusion. In 2009 the Office of Naval Research debarred him for 28 months, until September 2011, from receiving U.S. Federal Funding. During that period his name was listed in the 'Excluded Parties List' to prevent him from receiving grants from any government agency.

== See also ==
- List of scientific misconduct incidents
