= Nanochemistry =

Combination of chemistry and nanoscience

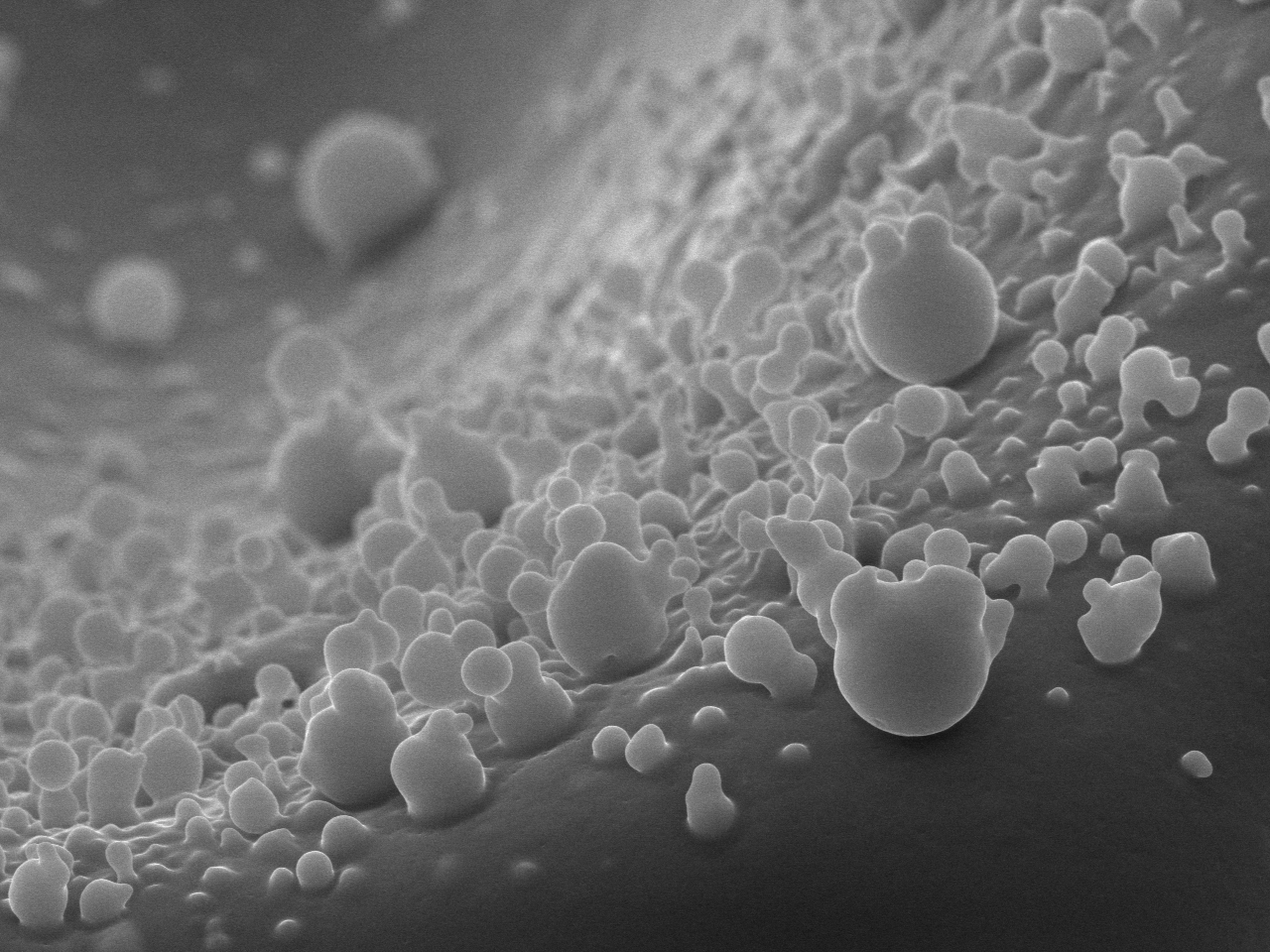
Selenium nanoparticles

Nanochemistry is an emerging sub-discipline of the chemical and material sciences that deals with the development of new methods for creating nanoscale materials. The term "nanochemistry" was first used by Ozin in 1992 as 'the uses of chemical synthesis to reproducibly afford nanomaterials from the atom "up", contrary to the nanoengineering and nanophysics approach that operates from the bulk "down"'. Nanochemistry focuses on solid-state chemistry that emphasizes synthesis of building blocks that are dependent on size, surface, shape, and defect properties, rather than the actual production of matter. Atomic and molecular properties mainly deal with the degrees of freedom of atoms in the periodic table. However, nanochemistry introduced other degrees of freedom that controls material's behaviors by transformation into solutions. Nanoscale objects exhibit novel material properties, largely as a consequence of their finite small size. Several chemical modifications on nanometer-scaled structures approve size dependent effects. Three specializations of nanochemistry are molecular nanotopology, nanointerface chemistry and nanoelectrochemistry.

Nanochemistry is used in chemical, materials and physical science as well as engineering, biological, and medical applications. Silica, gold, polydimethylsiloxane, cadmium selenide, iron oxide, and carbon are materials that show its transformative power. Nanochemistry can make the most effective contrast agent of MRI out of iron oxide (rust) which can detect cancers and kill them at their initial stages. Silica (glass) can be used to bend or stop lights in their tracks. Developing countries also use silicone to make circuits for the fluids used in pathogen detection. Nano-construct synthesis leads to the self-assembly of the building blocks into functional structures that may be useful for electronic, photonic, medical, or bioanalytical problems. Nanochemical methods can be used to create carbon nanomaterials such as carbon nanotubes, graphene, and fullerenes which have gained attention in recent years due to their remarkable mechanical and electrical properties.

== History ==
One of the first scientific reports is the colloidal gold particles synthesized by Michael Faraday as early as 1857. By the early 1940's, precipitated and fumed silica nanoparticles were being manufactured and sold in USA and Germany as substitutes for ultrafine carbon black for rubber reinforcements.

== Applications ==
=== Medicine ===
==== Magnetic Resonance Imaging (MRI) Detection ====
Over the past two decades, iron oxide nanoparticles for biomedical use had increased dramatically, largely due to its ability of non-invasive imaging, targeting and triggering drug release, or cancer therapy. Stem or immune cell could be marked with iron oxide nanoparticles to be detected by Magnetic resonance imaging (MRI). However, the concentration of iron oxide nanoparticles needs to be high enough to enable the significant detection by MRI. Due to the limited understanding of physicochemical nature of iron oxide nanoparticles in biological systems, more research is needed to ensure nanoparticles can be controlled under certain conditions for medical usage without posing harm to humans.

==== Drug delivery ====
Emerging methods of drug delivery involving nanotechnological methods can be useful by improving bodily response, specific targeting, and non-toxic metabolism. Many nanotechnological methods and materials can be functionalized for drug delivery. Ideal materials employ a controlled-activation nanomaterial to carry a drug cargo into the body. Mesoporous silica nanoparticles (MSN) have increased in research popularity due to their large surface area and flexibility for various individual modifications while maintaining high-resolution performance under imaging techniques. Activation methods greatly vary across nanoscale drug delivery molecules, but the most commonly used activation method uses specific wavelengths of light to release the cargo. Nanovalve-controlled cargo release uses low-intensity light and plasmonic heating to release the cargo in a variation of MSN containing gold molecules. The two-photon activated photo-transducer (2-NPT) uses near infrared wavelengths of light to induce the breaking of a disulfide bond to release the cargo. Recently, nanodiamonds have demonstrated potential in drug delivery due to non-toxicity, spontaneous absorption through the skin, and the ability to enter the blood–brain barrier.

The unique structure of carbon nanotubes also gives rise to many inventions of new medical methods. As more medicine is made at the nanoscopic level to create more ways for human to detect and treat diseases, carbon nanotubes become a stronger candidate in new detection methods and therapeutic strategies. Specially, carbon nanotubes can be transformed into sophisticated biomolecules and allow its detection through changes in the carbon nanotube fluorescence spectra. Also, carbon nanotubes can be designed to match the size of small drug and endocitozed by a target cell, hence becoming a delivery agent.

==== Tissue engineering ====
Cells are very sensitive to nanotopographical features, so optimization of surfaces in tissue engineering has pushed towards implantation. Under appropriate conditions, a carefully crafted 3-dimensional scaffold is used to direct cell seeds toward artificial organ growth. The 3-D scaffold incorporates various nanoscale factors that control the environment for optimal and appropriate functionality. The scaffold is an analog of the in vivo extracellular matrix in vitro, allowing for successful artificial organ growth by providing the necessary, complex biological factors in vitro.

==== Wounds healing ====
For abrasions and wounds, nanochemistry has demonstrated applications in improving the healing process. Electrospinning is a polymerization method used biologically in tissue engineering but can also be used for wound dressing and drug delivery. This produces nanofibers that encourage cell proliferation, antibacterial properties, in controlled environment. These properties appear macroscopically, however, nanoscale versions may show improved efficiency due to nanotopographical features. Targeted interfaces between nanofibers and wounds have higher surface area interactions and are advantageous in vivo. There is evidence that certain nanoparticles of silver are useful to inhibit some viruses and bacteria.

=== Cosmetics ===
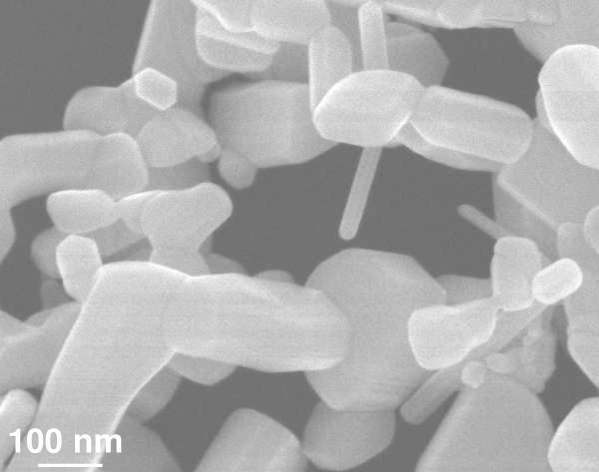
Zinc oxide nanoparticles

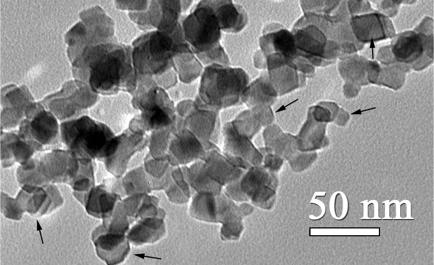
Titanium dioxide nanoparticles

Materials in certain cosmetics such as sun cream, moisturizer, and deodorant may have potential benefits from the use of nanochemistry. Manufacturers are working to increase the effectiveness of various cosmetics by facilitating oil nanoemulsion. These particles have extended the boundaries in managing wrinkling, dehydrated, and inelastic skin associated with aging. In sunscreen, titanium dioxide and zinc oxide nanoparticles prove to be effective UV filters but can also penetrate through skin. These chemicals protect the skin against harmful UV light by absorbing or reflecting the light and prevent the skin from retaining full damage by photoexcitation of electrons in the nanoparticle.

=== Electrics ===
==== Nanowire compositions ====
Scientists have devised a large number of nanowire compositions with controlled length, diameter, doping, and surface structure by using vapor and solution phase strategies. These oriented single crystals are being used in semiconductor nanowire devices such as diodes, transistors, logic circuits, lasers, and sensors. Since nanowires have a one-dimensional structure, meaning a large surface-to-volume ratio, the diffusion resistance decreases. In addition, their efficiency in electron transport which is due to the quantum confinement effect, makes their electrical properties be influenced by minor perturbation. Therefore, the use of these nanowires in nanosensor elements increases the sensitivity in electrode response. As mentioned above, the one-dimensionality and chemical flexibility of the semiconductor nanowires make them applicable in nanolasers. Peidong Yang and his co-workers have done some research on the room-temperature ultraviolet nanowires used in nanolasers. They have concluded that using short wavelength nanolasers has applications in different fields such as optical computing, information storage, and microanalysis.

=== Catalysis ===
==== Nanoenzymes (or nanozymes) ====
The small size of nanoenzymes (or nanozymes) (1–100 nm) has provided them with unique optical, magnetic, electronic, and catalytic properties. Moreover, the control of surface functionality of nanoparticles and the predictable nanostructure of these small-sized enzymes have allowed them to create a complex structure on their surface that can meet the needs of specific applications

== Research areas ==
=== Nanodiamonds ===
==== Synthesis ====
Fluorescent nanoparticles are highly sought after. They have broad applications, but their use in macroscopic arrays allows them efficient in applications of plasmonics, photonics, and quantum communications. While there are many methods in assembling nanoparticles array, especially gold nanoparticles, they tend to be weakly bonded to their substrate so they can't be used for wet chemistry processing steps or lithography. Nanodiamonds allow for greater variability in access that can subsequently be used to couple plasmonic waveguides to realize quantum plasmonic circuitry.

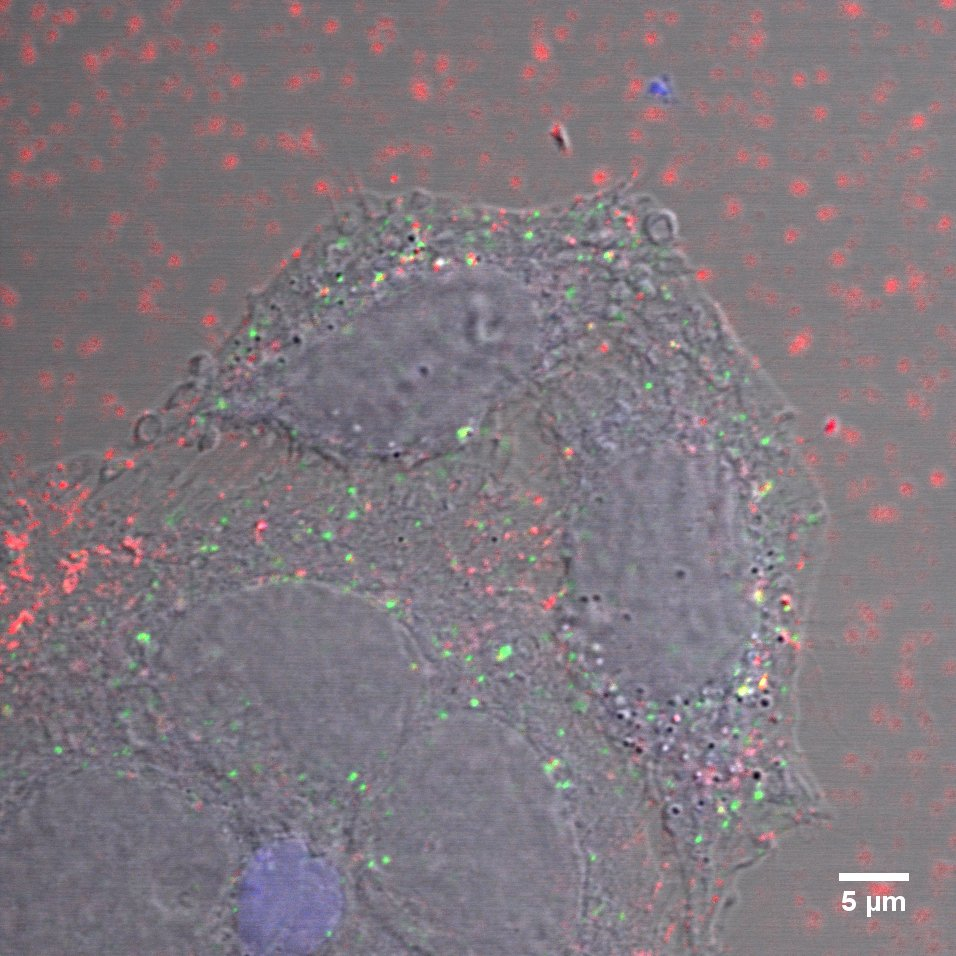
Fluorescent nanodiamonds surrounding living HeLa cells

Nanodiamonds can be synthesized by employing nanoscale carbonaceous seeds created in a single step by using a mask-free electron beam-induced position technique to add amine groups. This assembles nanodiamonds into an array. The presence of dangling bonds at the nanodiamond surface allows them to be functionalized with a variety of ligands. The surfaces of these nanodiamonds are terminated with carboxylic acid groups, enabling their attachment to amine-terminated surfaces through carbodiimide coupling chemistry. This process affords a high yield that relies on covalent bonding between the amine and carboxyl functional groups on amorphous carbon and nanodiamond surfaces in the presence of EDC. Thus unlike gold nanoparticles, they can withstand processing and treatment, for many device applications.

==== Fluorescent (nitrogen vacancy) ====
Fluorescent properties in nanodiamonds arise from the presence of nitrogen-vacancy (NV) centers, nitrogen atoms next to a vacancy. Fluorescent nanodiamond (FND) was invented in 2005 and has since been used in various fields of study. The invention received a US patent in 2008 States7326837 B2 United States 7326837 B2, Chau-Chung Han; Huan-Cheng Chang & Shen-Chung Lee et al., "Clinical applications of crystalline diamond particles", issued February 5, 2008, assigned to Academia Sinica, Taipei (TW), and a subsequent patent in 2012 States8168413 B2 United States 8168413 B2, Huan-Cheng Chang; Wunshian Fann & Chau-Chung Han, "Luminescent Diamond Particles", issued May 1, 2012, assigned to Academia Sinica, Taipei (TW). NV centers can be created by irradiating nanodiamonds with high-energy particles (electrons, protons, helium ions), followed by vacuum-annealing at 600–800 °C. Irradiation forms vacancies in the diamond structure while vacuum-annealing migrates these vacancies, which will get trapped by nitrogen atoms within the nanodiamond. This process produces two types of NV centers. Two types of NV centers are formed—neutral (NV0) and negatively charged (NV–)—and these have different emission spectra. The NV– the center is of particular interest because it has an S = 1 spin ground state that can be spin-polarized by optical pumping and manipulated using electron paramagnetic resonance. Fluorescent nanodiamonds combine the advantages of semiconductor quantum dots (small size, high photostability, bright multicolor fluorescence) with biocompatibility, non-toxicity, and rich surface chemistry, which means that they have the potential to revolutionize Vivo imaging applications.

==== Drug-delivery and biological compatibility ====
Nanodiamonds can self-assemble and a wide range of small molecules, proteins antibodies, therapeutics, and nucleic acids can bind to its surface allowing for drug delivery, protein-mimicking, and surgical implants. Other potential biomedical applications are the use of nanodiamonds as support for solid-phase peptide synthesis and as sorbents for detoxification and separation and fluorescent nanodiamonds for biomedical imaging. Nanodiamonds are capable of biocompatibility, the ability to carry a broad range of therapeutics, dispersibility in water and scalability, and the potential for targeted therapy all properties needed for a drug delivery platform. The small size, stable core, rich surface chemistry, ability to self-assemble, and low cytotoxicity of nanodiamonds have led to suggestions that they could be used to mimic globular proteins. Nanodiamonds have been mostly studied as potential injectable therapeutic agents for generalized drug delivery, but it has also been shown that films of Parylene nanodiamond composites can be used for localized sustained release of drugs over periods ranging from two days to one month.

=== Nanolithography ===
Nanolithography is the technique to pattern materials and build devices under nano-scale. Nanolithography is often used together with thin-film-deposition, self-assembly, and self-organization techniques for various nanofabrications purpose. Many practical applications make use of nanolithography, including semiconductor chips in computers. There are many types of nanolithography, which include:

- Photolithography
- Electron-beam lithography
- X-ray lithography
- Extreme ultraviolet lithography
- Light coupling nanolithography
- Scanning probe microscope
- Nanoimprint lithography
- Dip-Pen nanolithography
- Soft lithography

Each nanolithography technique has varying factors of the resolution, time consumption, and cost. There are three basic methods used by nanolithography. One involves using a resist material that acts as a "mask", known as photoresists, to cover and protect the areas of the surface that are intended to be smooth. The uncovered portions can now be etched away, with the protective material acting as a stencil. The second method involves directly carving the desired pattern. Etching may involve using a beam of quantum particles, such as electrons or light, or chemical methods such as oxidation or Self-assembled monolayers. The third method places the desired pattern directly on the surface, producing a final product that is ultimately a few nanometers thicker than the original surface. To visualize the surface to be fabricated, the surface must be visualized by a nano-resolution microscope, which includes the scanning probe microscopy and the atomic force microscope. Both microscopes can also be engaged in processing the final product.

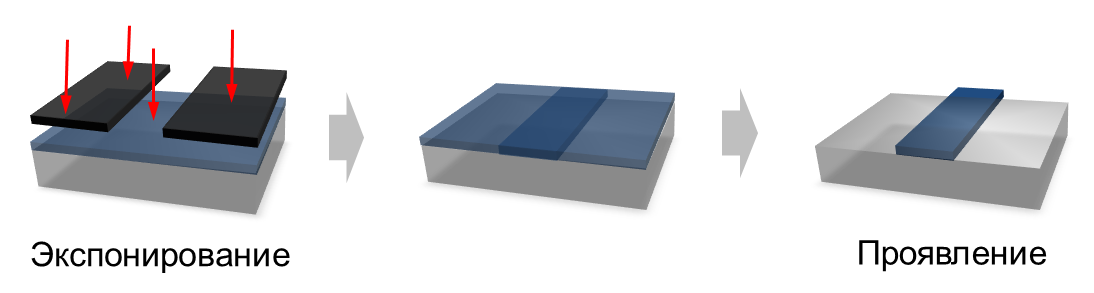
Negative photoresist

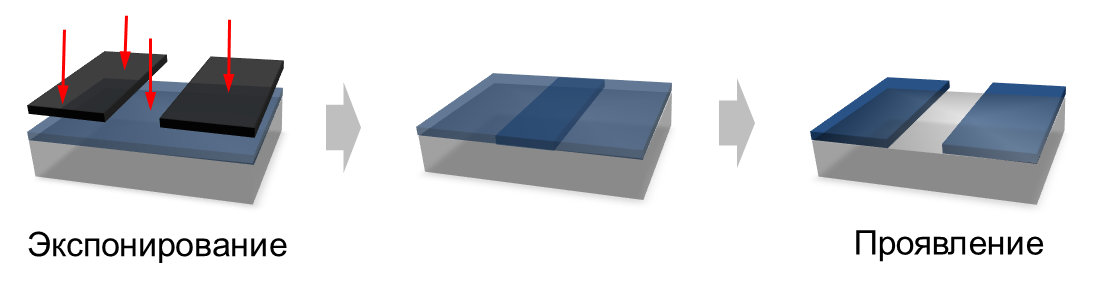
Positive photoresist

==== Photoresists ====
Photoresists are light-sensitive materials, composed of a polymer, a sensitizer, and a solvent. Each element has a particular function. The polymer changes its structure when it is exposed to radiation. The solvent allows the photoresist to be spun and to form thin layers over the wafer surface. Finally, the sensitizer, or inhibitor, controls the photochemical reaction in the polymer phase.

Photoresists can be classified as positive or negative. In positive photoresists, the photochemical reaction that occurs during exposure, weakens the polymer, making it more soluble to the developer so the positive pattern is achieved. Therefore, the masks contains an exact copy of the pattern, which is to remain on the wafer, as a stencil for subsequent processing. In the case of negative photoresists, exposure to light causes the polymerization of the photoresist so the negative resist remains on the surface of the substrate where it is exposed, and the developer solution removes only the unexposed areas. Masks used for negative photoresists contain the inverse or photographic "negative" of the pattern to be transferred. Both negative and positive photoresists have their own advantages. The advantages of negative photoresists are good adhesion to silicon, lower cost, and a shorter processing time. The advantages of positive photoresists are better resolution and thermal stability.

=== Nanometer-size clusters ===
Monodisperse, nanometer-size clusters (also known as nanoclusters) are synthetically grown crystals whose size and structure influence their properties through the effects of quantum confinement. One method of growing these crystals is through inverse micellar cages in non-aqueous solvents. Research conducted on the optical properties of MoS_{2} nanoclusters compared them to their bulk crystal counterparts and analyzed their absorbance spectra. The analysis reveals that size dependence of the absorbance spectrum by bulk crystals is continuous, whereas the absorbance spectrum of nanoclusters takes on discrete energy levels. This indicates a shift from solid-like to molecular-like behavior which occurs at a reported cluster the size of 4.5 – 3.0 nm.

Interest in the magnetic properties of nanoclusters exists due to their potential use in magnetic recording, magnetic fluids, permanent magnets, and catalysis. Analysis of Fe clusters shows behavior consistent with ferromagnetic or superparamagnetic behavior due to strong magnetic interactions within clusters.

Dielectric properties of nanoclusters are also a subject of interest due to their possible applications in catalysis, photocatalysis, micro capacitors, microelectronics, and nonlinear optics.

=== Nanothermodynamics ===
The idea of nanothermodynamics was initially proposed by T. L. Hill in 1960, theorizing the differences between differential and integral forms of properties due to small sizes. The size, shape, and environment of a nanoparticle affect the power law, or its proportionality, between nano and macroscopic properties. Transitioning from macro to nano changes the proportionality from exponential to power. Therefore, nanothermodynamics and the theory of statistical mechanics are related in concept. Building on these ideas, recent research has shown that, in finite nanosystems, the spatial dependence of intensive variables persists even in the thermodynamic limit.

== Notable researchers ==
There are several researchers in nanochemistry that have been credited with the development of the field. Geoffrey A. Ozin, from the University of Toronto, is known as one of the "founding fathers of Nanochemistry" due to his four and a half decades of research on this subject. This research includes the study of matrix isolation laser Raman spectroscopy, naked metal clusters chemistry and photochemistry, nanoporous materials, hybrid nanomaterials, mesoscopic materials, and ultrathin inorganic nanowires.

Another chemist who is also viewed as one of the nanochemistry's pioneers is Charles M. Lieber at Harvard University. He is known for his contributions to the development of nano-scale technologies, particularly in the field of biology and medicine. The technologies include nanowires, a new class of quasi-one-dimensional materials that have demonstrated superior electrical, optical, mechanical, and thermal properties and can be used potentially as biological sensors. Research under Lieber has delved into the use of nanowires mapping brain activity.

Shimon Weiss, a professor at the University of California, Los Angeles, is known for his research of fluorescent semiconductor nanocrystals, a subclass of quantum dots, for biological labeling.

Paul Alivisatos, from the University of California, Berkeley, is also notable for his research on the fabrication and use of nanocrystals. This research has the potential to develop insight into the mechanisms of small-scale particles such as the process of nucleation, cation exchange, and branching. A notable application of these crystals is the development of quantum dots.

Peidong Yang, another researcher from the University of California, Berkeley, is also notable for his contributions to the development of 1-dimensional nanostructures. The Yang group has active research projects in the areas of nanowire photonics, nanowire-based solar cells, nanowires for solar to fuel conversion, nanowire thermoelectrics, nanowire-cell interface, nanocrystal catalysis, nanotube nanofluidics, and plasmonics.

== Selected books ==
- J.W. Steed, D.R. Turner, K. Wallace Core Concepts in Supramolecular Chemistry and Nanochemistry (Wiley, 2007) 315p. ISBN 978-0-470-85867-7
- Brechignac C., Houdy P., Lahmani M. (Eds.) Nanomaterials and Nanochemistry (Springer, 2007) 748p. ISBN 978-3-540-72993-8
- H. Watarai, N. Teramae, T. Sawada Interfacial Nanochemistry: Molecular Science and Engineering at Liquid-Liquid Interfaces (Nanostructure Science and Technology) 2005. 321p. ISBN 978-0-387-27541-3
- Ozin G., Arsenault A.C., Cademartiri L. Nanochemistry: A Chemical Approach to Nanomaterials 2nd Eds. (Royal Society of Chemistry, 2008) 820p. ISBN 978-1847558954
- Kenneth J. Klabunde; Ryan M. Richards, eds. (2009). Nanoscale Materials in Chemistry (2nd ed.). Wiley. ISBN 978-0-470-22270-6.
