= Shouheng Sun =

Chinese-American chemist

- 孙守恒
- Education: Sichuan University; Nanjing University; Brown University
- Scientific career
- Workplaces: Brown University
- Thesis: The Organometallic Chemistry of Polyarene Manganese Carbonyl Complexes (1996)
- Doctoral advisor: Dwight A. Sweigart

Shouheng Sun (Chinese: 孙守恒) is a Chinese-American chemist. He is currently Vernon K. Krieble Professor of Chemistry and Professor of Engineering at Brown University. Sun's research areas include nanochemistry and materials chemistry.

Sun attended Sichuan University in Chengdu, graduating with a Bachelor of Science in chemistry in 1984. He completed a Master of Science in chemistry at Nanjing University. Sun completed his doctorate in chemistry at Brown University in 1996. Sun has taught at Brown since 2005, having previously worked at the Thomas J. Watson Research Center. Sun was named the Vernon K. Krieble Professor of Chemistry in 2016.
