= Lecithin =

Generic term for amphiphilic substances of plant and animal origin

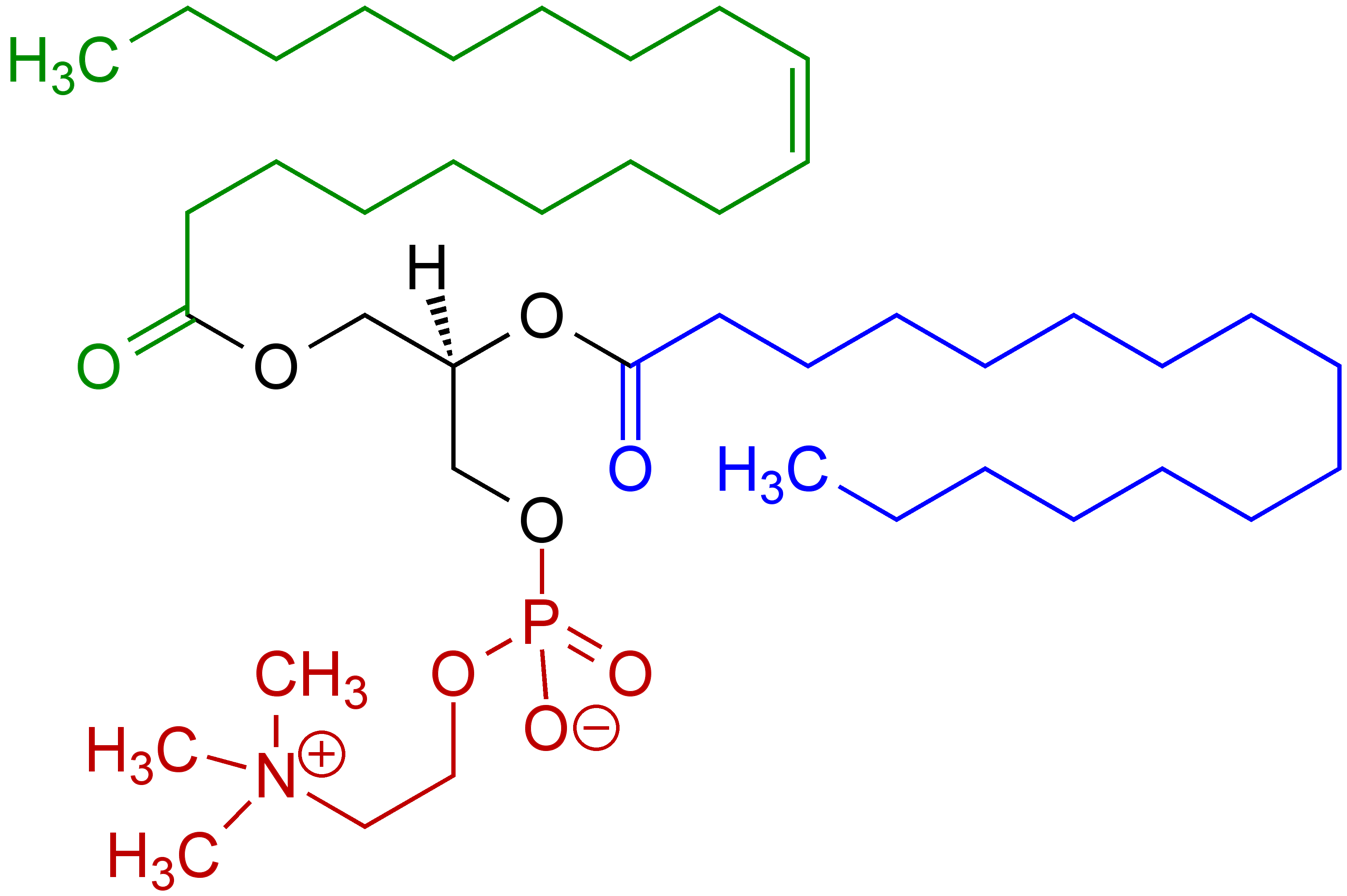
POPC, an example of a phosphatidylcholine, a type of phospholipid in lecithin. Shown in red – choline residue and phosphate group; black – glycerol residue; green – monounsaturated fatty acid residue; blue – saturated fatty acid residue.

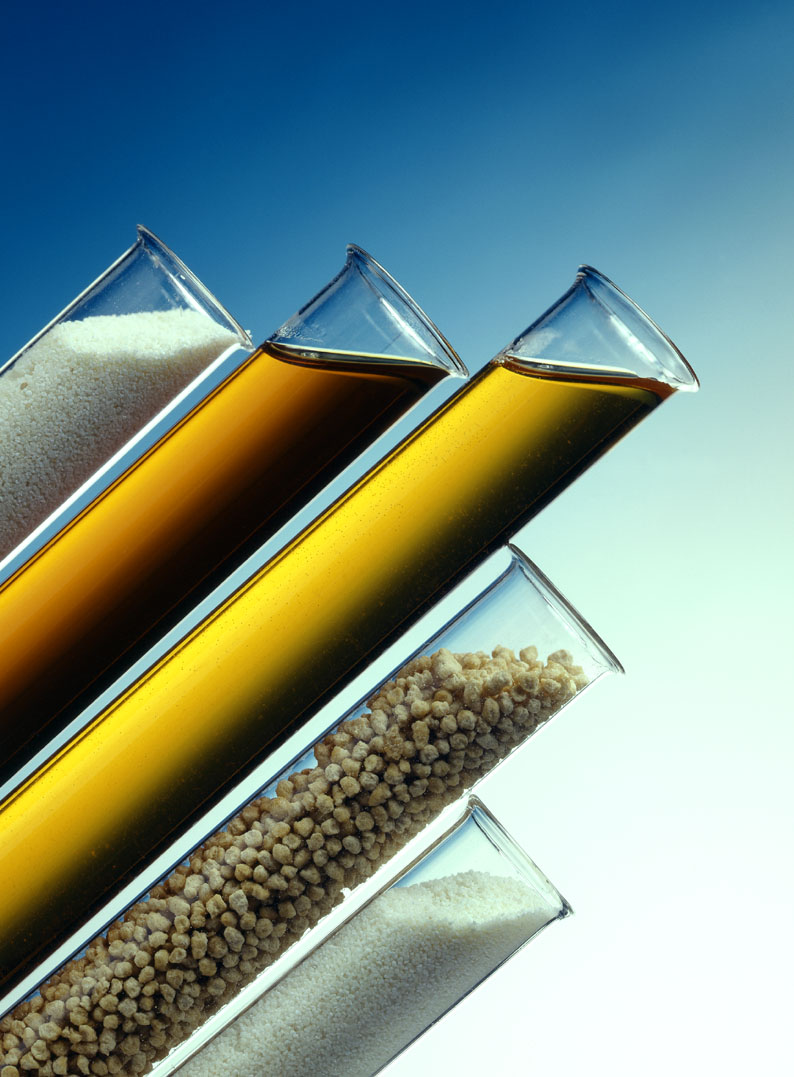
The different forms of lecithin – powder, two different concentration liquids, granular and powder lecithin

Lecithin (/ˈlɛsɪθɪn/ LESS-ih-thin; from Ancient Greek λέκιθος (lékithos) 'yolk') is a generic term to designate a group of yellow-brownish fatty substances occurring in animal and plant tissues which are amphiphilic – they attract both water and fatty substances (and so are both hydrophilic and lipophilic), and are used for smoothing food textures, emulsifying, homogenizing liquid mixtures, and repelling sticking materials.

Lecithins are mixtures of glycerophospholipids including phosphatidylcholine, phosphatidylethanolamine, phosphatidylinositol, phosphatidylserine, and phosphatidic acid.

Lecithin was first isolated in 1845 by the French chemist and pharmacist Théodore Gobley. In 1850, he named the phosphatidylcholine lécithine. Gobley originally isolated lecithin from egg yolk and established the complete chemical formula of phosphatidylcholine in 1874; in between, he demonstrated the presence of lecithin in a variety of biological materials, including venous blood, human lungs, bile, roe, and brains of humans, sheep and chicken.

Lecithin can easily be extracted chemically using solvents such as hexane, ethanol, acetone, petroleum ether or benzene; or extraction can be done mechanically. Common sources include egg yolk, marine foods, soybeans, milk, rapeseed, cottonseed, and sunflower oil. It has low solubility in water, but is an excellent emulsifier. In aqueous solution, its phospholipids can form either liposomes, bilayer sheets, micelles, or lamellar structures, depending on hydration and temperature. This results in a type of surfactant that usually is classified as amphipathic. Lecithin is sold as a food additive and dietary supplement. In cooking, it is sometimes used as an emulsifier and to prevent sticking, for example in non-stick cooking spray.

== Production ==
Commercial lecithin, as used by food manufacturers, is a mixture of phospholipids in oil. The lecithin can be obtained by water degumming the extracted oil of seeds. It is a mixture of various phospholipids, and the composition depends on the origin of the lecithin. A major source of lecithin is soybean oil. Because of the EU requirement to declare additions of allergens in foods, in addition to regulations regarding genetically modified crops, a gradual shift to other sources of lecithin (such as sunflower lecithin) is taking place. The main phospholipids in lecithin from soy and sunflower are phosphatidylcholine, phosphatidylinositol, phosphatidylethanolamine, phosphatidylserine, and phosphatidic acid. They are often abbreviated to PC, PI, PE, PS and PA, respectively. Purified phospholipids are produced by companies commercially.

=== Hydrolysed lecithin ===
To modify the performance of lecithin to make it suitable for the product to which it is added, it may be hydrolysed enzymatically. In hydrolysed lecithins, a portion of the phospholipids have one fatty acid removed by phospholipase. Such phospholipids are called lysophospholipids. The most commonly used phospholipase is phospholipase A2, which removes the fatty acid at the C2 position of glycerol. Lecithins may also be modified by a process called fractionation. During this process, lecithin is mixed with an alcohol, usually ethanol. Some phospholipids, such as phosphatidylcholine, have good solubility in ethanol, whereas most other phospholipids do not dissolve well in ethanol. The ethanol is separated from the lecithin sludge, after which the ethanol is removed by evaporation to obtain a phosphatidylcholine-enriched lecithin fraction.

=== Genetically modified crops as a source of lecithin ===
As described above, lecithin is highly processed. Therefore, genetically modified (GM) protein or DNA from the original GM crop from which it is derived often is undetectable – in other words, it is not substantially different from lecithin derived from non-GM crops. Nonetheless, consumer concerns about genetically modified food have extended to highly purified derivatives from GM food, such as lecithin. This concern led to policy and regulatory changes in the EU in 2000, when Commission Regulation (EC) 50/2000 was passed which required labelling of food containing additives derived from GMOs, including lecithin. Because it is nearly impossible to detect the origin of derivatives such as lecithin, the European regulations require those who wish to sell lecithin in Europe to use a meticulous, but essential system of identity preservation (IP).

== Properties and applications ==
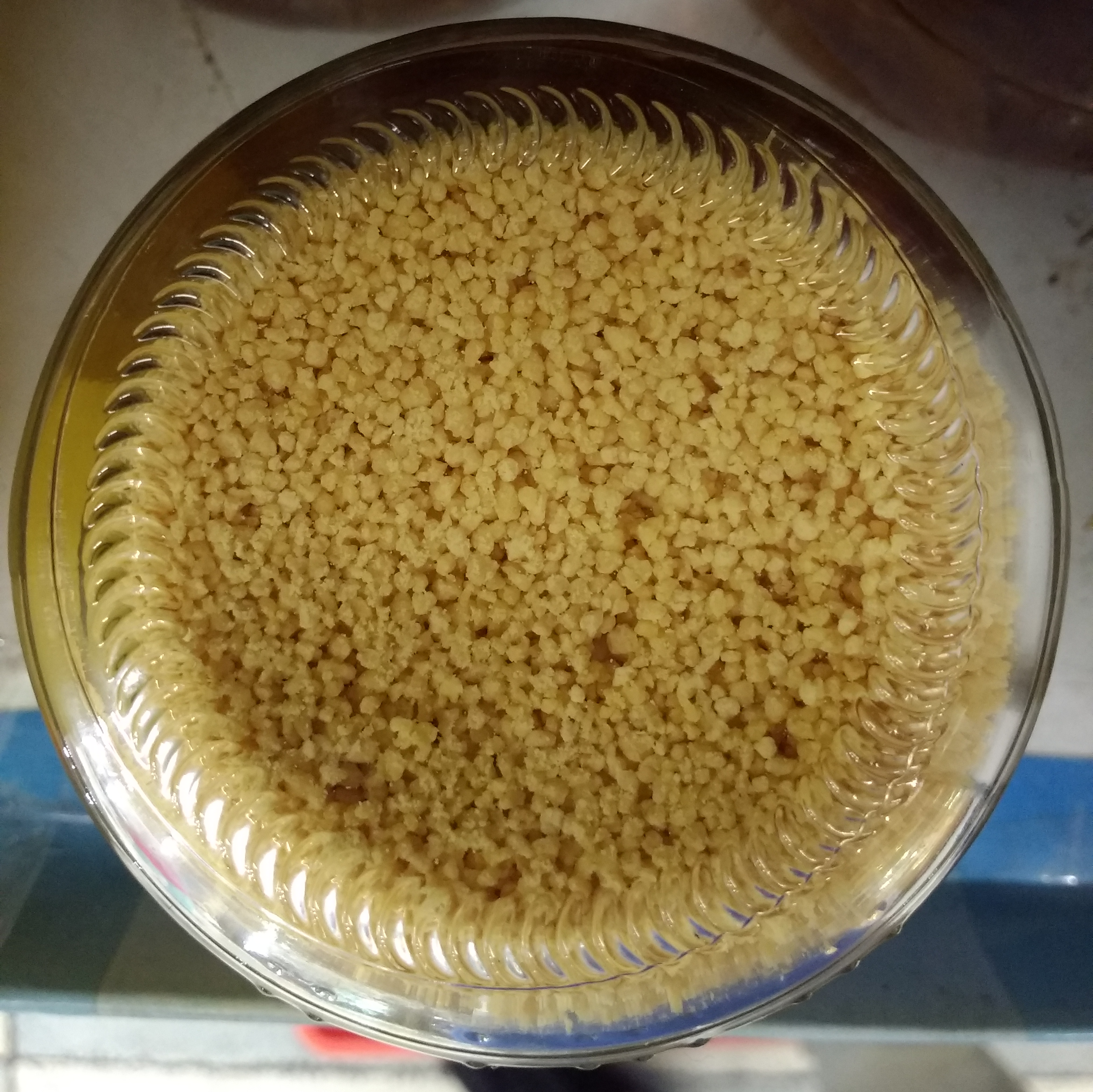
Soy lecithin for sale at a grocery store in Uruguay

Lecithins have emulsification and lubricant properties, and are a surfactant. They can be completely metabolized (see inositol) by humans, and are therefore well tolerated by humans and regarded as nontoxic when ingested.

The major components of commercial soybean-derived lecithin are:

- 33–35% soybean oil
- 20–21% phosphatidylinositols
- 19–21% phosphatidylcholine
- 8–20% phosphatidylethanolamine
- 5–11% other phosphatides including phosphatidylserine
- 5% free carbohydrates
- 2–5% sterols
- 1% moisture

Lecithin is used for applications in human food, animal feed, pharmaceuticals, paints, and other industrial applications.

Applications include:

- In the pharmaceutical industry, it acts as a wetting agent, stabilizing agent and a choline enrichment carrier, helps in emulsification and encapsulation, and is a good dispersing agent. It can be used in manufacture of intravenous fat infusions and for therapeutic use.
- In animal feed, it enriches fat and protein and improves pelletization.
- In the paint industry, it forms protective coatings for surfaces with painting and printing ink, helps as a rust inhibitor, is a colour intensifying agent, catalyst, conditioning aid modifier, and dispersing aid; it is a good stabilizing and suspending agent, emulsifier, and wetting agent, helps in maintaining uniform mixture of several pigments, helps in grinding of metal oxide pigments, is a spreading and mixing aid, prevents hard settling of pigments, eliminates foam in water-based paints, and helps in fast dispersion of latex-based paints.
- Lecithin also may be used as a release agent for plastics, an anti-sludge additive in motor lubricants, an anti-gumming agent in gasoline, and an emulsifier, spreading agent, and antioxidant in textile, rubber, and other industries.

=== Food additive ===
The nontoxicity of lecithin leads to its use with food, as a food additive or in food preparation. It is used commercially in foods requiring a natural emulsifier or lubricant.

In confectionery, it reduces viscosity, replaces more expensive ingredients, controls sugar crystallization and the flow properties of chocolate, helps in the homogeneous mixing of ingredients, improves shelf life for some products, and can be used as a coating. In emulsions and fat spreads, such as margarines with a high fat content of more than 75%, it stabilizes emulsions, reduces spattering (splashing and scattering of oil droplets) during frying, improves texture of spreads and flavor release. In doughs and baking, it reduces fat and egg requirements, helps even out distribution of ingredients in dough, stabilizes fermentation, increases volume, protects yeast cells in dough when frozen, and acts as a releasing agent to prevent sticking and simplify cleaning. It improves wetting properties of hydrophilic powders (such as low-fat proteins) and lipophilic powders (such as cocoa powder), controls dust, and helps complete dispersion in water. Lecithin keeps non-fat cocoa particles and cocoa butter in a candy bar from separating. It can be used as a component of cooking sprays to prevent sticking and as a releasing agent.

In the EU lecithin is designated at food additive E322.

=== Dietary supplement ===
Lecithin contains dietary precursors to choline, an essential nutrient, which was formerly classified as a B vitamin (vitamin B_{4}). Lecithin is a mixture of fats that contain phospholipids—including phosphatidylcholine, which makes up about 25 to 35 percent of lecithin—and the human body can convert phosphatidylcholine into choline.

Phosphatidylcholine is approximately 13.7% choline; as such, about 342 mg of choline is present per 10 grams of lecithin. Therefore, 10 grams of lecithin can be a source for the body to produce about the same amount of choline (342 mg) as can be produced by the body from 2 egg yolks. The recommended intake of choline varies depending on age, sex, and physiological conditions, and is roughly 500 mg per day for adults.

Lecithin is generally recognized as safe (GRAS) by the FDA.

There is no robust, scientifically validated clinical research investigating the safety and effectiveness of high-dose lecithin supplementation in lactating women and their infants. A meta-analysis found no evidence that high doses of lecithin improved milk flow in breast-feeding mothers or infants, though concluded that "higher maternal choline intake was likely to be associated with better child neurocognition and neurodevelopment."

Soy lecithin does not contain enough allergenic proteins for most people allergic to soy, although the US FDA only exempts a few soy lecithin products from its mandatory requirements for allergenic source labeling. An alternative source of lecithin, derived from sunflowers, is available as a dietary supplement for those with concerns about soy-based foods.

A 2003 review of randomized trials found no benefit of lecithin in people with dementia.

=== Religious restrictions ===
Soy-derived lecithin is considered by some to be kitniyot and prohibited on Passover for Ashkenazi Jews when many grain-based foods are forbidden, but not at other times. This does not necessarily affect Sephardi Jews, who do not have the same restrictions on rice and kitniyot during Passover.

Muslims are not forbidden to eat lecithin per se; however, since it may be derived from animal as well as plant sources, care must be taken to ensure the source is halal. Lecithin derived from plants and egg yolks is permissible, as is that derived from animals slaughtered according to the rules of dhabihah.

Sunflower lecithin, sourced from the seeds of sunflowers, is entirely plant-based and may be an option for those with religious or cultural concerns regarding food intake.

== See also ==
- Phytosome
