= Gold in cosmetics =

Gold nanoparticles (AuNPs) are used by cosmetic companies to create creams and lotions. Gold nanoparticles have been used in the past for pharmaceutical and medical uses, but only recently have cosmetic brands sought patents for gold nanoparticles to use them for cosmetic formulation.

Research conducted by Tatsiana Mironava, PhD, from Stony Brook University concluded that the size, concentration and frequency of application plays a major part in determining if the material is toxic. Research studies are being conducted to find out the benefits of using gold nanoparticles in cosmetic products and creams. Some of the products that claim to use gold in their formulations include the L'Oreal L'Core Paris 24k Collection. Recent studies have concluded that gold is inert and safe for internal medicine, but there is still ongoing research as to the effects of gold when applied for other purposes in the body.

== Gold in skin care products ==
Gold is now used as an ingredient in skin care products. It is now flaked, liquified and added in moisturizers, sunscreens, eye creams and lip balms. Spa centers also use gold facials, and these are priced around $100 to $1,000. Cosmetic makers cite the use of gold in medicine, it is given to patients with rheumatoid arthritis. The cancer researcher Professor Debabrata Mukhopadhya at the Mayo Clinic said in 2010 that while gold nano particles showed promise for skin care, they were still toxic when injected in high doses in mice.

Dr. Judith Hellman, a dermatologist in New York City, said about gold in skin care: "At best, they do nothing, and at worst, they can give you irritation of the skin".

Gold nanoparticles are also used in other cosmetic products including deodorant.

== Brands using nanocosmetics ==
A 2012 study found that almost all the major cosmetic manufacturers are already using nanotechnology in cosmetics. Cosmetics Estee Lauder and L'Core Paris have entered the Nanomarket, with a range of products that make use of "Nanoparticles".

Nano silver and Nanogold are harnessed for their antibacterial and antifungal properties and used in cosmetic products. Manufacturers are producing underarm deodorants with claim that they provide 24-Hour antibacterial protection. Nanosized gold, like nanosilver, is said to be effective in disinfecting bacteria in the mouth and is added in toothpaste.
