= Nanotechnology in cosmetics =

Nanomaterials are materials with a size ranging from 1 to 100 nm in at least one dimension. At the nanoscale, material properties become different. These unique properties can be exploited for a variety of applications, including the use of nanoparticles in skincare and cosmetics products.

Cosmeceuticals is one of the fastest growing industries in terms of personal care, accompanied by an increase in nano cosmeceuticals research and applications.

== Titanium dioxide and zinc oxide nanoparticles in sunscreen ==
Sunscreens are utilized to secure the skin from the destructive impacts of ultraviolet radiation from the sun. UVB (290-320 nm) together with UVA-2 (320–340 nm) and UVA-1 (340–400 nm) cause organic and metabolic reactions in the skin. Titanium dioxide (TiO_{2}) and zinc oxide (ZnO) minerals are often utilized in sunscreens as inorganic physical sun blockers owing to their absorption of light in the UV range. As TiO_{2} is proven to be more effective for blocking UVB and ZnO in the UVA range, the mix of these particles guarantees a broad-band UV shield.

To solve the cosmetic disadvantage of these opaque sunscreens, TiO_{2} and ZnO nanoparticles have been used as a replacement for TiO_{2} and ZnO microparticles. Since the surface area to volume proportion of particles increases as the particle measurement diminishes, nanoparticles (NPs), ie, nano objects with all dimensions in the nanoscale, might be increasingly (bio)reactive than typical mass materials. When particles become smaller than 100 nm, novel optical attributes develop, owing to discrete nature of nanoparticle optical energy levels. Pat et al., for instance, measured a 0.15 eV blue shift for 4.7 nm TiO_{2} nanoparticles relative to the bulk material counterpart.

When particles become smaller than the ideal light dispersing size (roughly half of the wavelength) visible light is transmitted and the particles appear transparent. This phenomenon explains the cosmetically undesired opaqueness of inorganic sunscreens and makes the utilization of NPs monetarily appealing. ZnO particles of 200 nm or smaller are transparent to the human eye.

TiO_{2} NPs become more effective sunblocking materials due to their larger surface area to volume ratio. The purpose behind this is in direct-illegal gap semiconductors, for example, TiO_{2}, direct electron transmissions are not allowed due to crystal symmetry. Absorption is subsequently small. However, it might be significantly upgraded when it happens at the precious crystal surface. This absorption upgrade gets significant for particles of 20 nm or smaller. Similarly, TiO_{2} becomes visibly transmissive when particle sizes are reduced to 10-20 nm in size.

=== Safety ===
The International Agency for Research on Cancer (IARC) has categorized TiO_{2} as an IARC group 2B carcinogen. The IARC made these decisions based on studies where rats are exposed to high concentrations of pigment-grade and ultrafine TiO_{2} dust. The lung cancers in rats appear similar pathology to those seen in people who are working in a dusty environment, thus the IARC concluded that the same impacts from high concentrations of pigment-grade and ultrafine TiO_{2} dust are relevant to human health.

However, ZnO is generally considered as safe a substance by the FDA when utilized as an UV filter as indicated by beauty care products directives. Although both the US Environmental Protection Agency and the European Community (inside the Registration, Evaluation, Authorization and Restriction of Chemical Substances law) have taken preventative steps to reduce nanoparticle risk, there are still no standardized rule for nanoparticles specifically.

== Liposomes in cosmetics and skincare ==
=== Liposomes structure ===
Liposomes are sphere-shaped vesicular structures self-assembled in a solvent composed of a broad type of lipids or other amphiphilic molecules. The vesicle structure of liposomes improves the effects on drug penetration through biological membranes, which enhance transdermal drug delivery.

=== Types of cosmetic liposomes ===
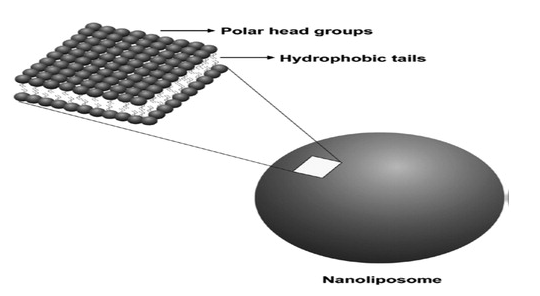
Nanoliposome Structure

Types of Liposomes	Description	Use
Niosomes	Small vesicle, usually made from alkyl- or dialkyl- polyglycerol ethers.	Increase product effectiveness; Enhanced penetration; Improve bioavailability; Stabilize drugs
Novasomes	Non-phospholipids oligolamellar lipid vesicles from polyoxyethylene fatty acid monoesters, cholesterol, and free fatty acids	Ability to cleave to skin or hair shafts
Marinosomes	Marine lipid extracts containing a high ratio of eicosapentaenoic acid and decosahexanoic acid	Safe for skin and eye contact; Reduce skin inflammation
Ultrasomes	Liposomal entrapment of endonuclease enzymes, UV-sensitive	Can detect UV radiation harm; Speed up UV radiation treatment by up to 4 times; Diminish risk of skin cancer
Photosomes	Releases photolysis enzymes from the plant Anacystinidulans	Prevent light from damaging the cell's DNA; Reduce risk of cancer by preventing suppression of immune system
Ethosomes	Multilayer vesicles made of phospholipid phosphatidylcholine, water, and ethanol	Can penetrate deep into skin layer; High efficiency in cosmetic delivery into the skin in terms of both quantity and depth
Yeast-based liposomes	Yeast cell-derived liposome containing Vitamin C	Repair, soothe, and oxygenate skin; Stimulate skin fibroblast which makes skin feel healthier
Phytosomes	Liposomes made from a mix of phospholipids and botanical extracts	Improve skin absorption of phytoconstituents
Sphingosome	Liposomes made of ceramides	Normalize damaged or dehydrated skin; Rehabilitate skin's barrier function
Nanosomes	Liposomes made of highly pure phosphatidylcholine	Anti-ageing serum
Glycerosomes	Liposomes containing glycerol and phospholipids	Deliver cosmeceuticals active ingredients; Healing and beautification properties; Improve skin defensive activity
Oleosomes	Natural liposomes acting as a reservoir of oils, vitamins, and pigments	Efficient delivery system; High stability and antioxidant properties
Invasomes	Liposomal vesicles containing ethanol and terpenes	High skin penetration properties; Potent carriers; Promote skin permeability
Catezomes	Non-phospholipids vesicles with cationic surface charge	Ideal delivery systems of active ingredients to surface of skin when penetration is not desirable; Can be preserved by skin and hair

=== Advantages and disadvantages of liposomes ===
==== Advantages ====
1. Increase efficacy and therapeutic index of drug and stability via encapsulation
2. Non-toxic, flexible, biocompatible, completely biodegradable, and non-immunogenic for systemic and non-systemic administrations
3. Reduce toxicity of the encapsulated agent (amphotericin B, Taxol)
4. Reduce the exposure of sensitive tissues to toxic drugs, site avoidance effect and flexibility to couple with site-specific ligands to achieve active targeting

==== Disadvantages ====
1. Low solubility
2. Short half-life
3. Sometimes phospholipid undergoes oxidation and hydrolysis-like reaction
4. Leakage and fusion of encapsulated drug/molecules
5. Production cost is high
6. Fewer stables

=== Topical drug delivery using ethosomes ===
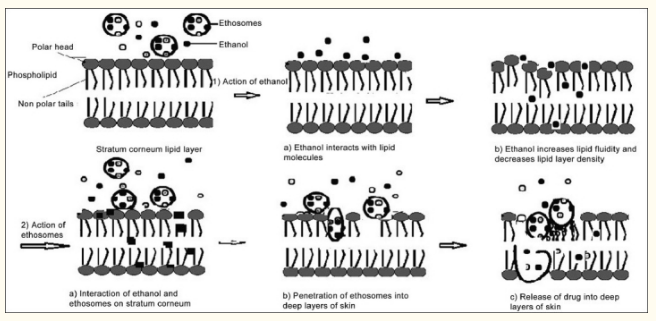
Proposed mechanism of penetration of ethosomal drug delivery system

The skin is the largest organ of the human body that restricts the movement of drug to the systemic circulation. The topical drug delivery system is a system where the drug reaches the systemic circulation through the protective skin layer. The main disadvantage of this route is the low diffusion rate of the drugs across the layer of skin which is the stratum corneum. To overcome this problem to a certain extent, ethosomes are used to enhance transdermal drug delivery systems.

== Gold nanoparticles in skin care and cosmetics ==
The utilization of gold in skin care and cosmetics dates back at least to the 1st century B.C in Egypt, where Queen Cleopatra is said to have used masks made from gold to maintain her skin complexion. It was said that she used it every night to enhance her complexion and improve the suppleness of her skin. Nowadays, gold has made its way into various skincare products such as lotion and cream, as well as skincare treatments such as facial masks. Gold in skincare products are usually in the form of colloidal gold, or more commonly called nanogold. These nanoparticles ranges in size from 5 nm to 400 nm. This section will discuss about the effect of gold nanoparticle in wound healing application together with the effect of gold in lotion and cream products.

=== Properties of gold nanoparticles ===
Gold nanoparticles usually have colors ranging from red to purple to blue and black depending on the size and aggregation state. They also come in various shapes and sizes: nanosphere, nanoshell, nanocluster, nanorod, nanostar, nanocube, branched, and nanotriangle. The shape of the gold nanoparticles is the main determinant for uptake into cells and for optical properties. Gold nanoparticles are stable and chemically inert. Moreover, they are also biocompatible, which is the main reason why nanogold is commonly integrated in skincare and cosmetics. Furthermore, gold nanoparticles have been investigated for antifungal and antibacterial properties, which are very valuable properties in cosmeceutical industries and in wound healing applications.

=== Gold nanoparticles in wound healing applications ===
In 2016, a paper published in the Journal of Biomaterials Application, titled "Collagen/gold nanoparticle composites: A potential skin wound healing biomaterial," discussed that in vivo studies of gold nanoparticle and collagen composites demonstrated high wound closure percentage, reduced inflammatory response, increased neovascularization, and granulation tissue formation. It was also shown that these improvements in healing effects increase proportionally with the amount of gold nanoparticles worked into the collagen scaffold.

In another study, the effect of spherical gold nanoparticles as a wound healing agent was tested in rat model by coupling gold nanoparticles with photobiomodulation therapy (PBMT). PBMT is a light stimulated therapy that is used for wound healing treatment without any significant temperature changes. The coupling of gold nanoparticles and PBMT increase the wound contraction rate by approximately 1.25 times than the control group that received no gold. nanoparticle treatment.

=== Gold in lotion and face masks ===
Gold has been widely used in facial masks. Aside from its antifungal and antibacterial properties, gold is also known to have anti-ageing benefits, anti-inflammatory properties as well as radiance-boosting qualities. Gold nanoparticles can help repair skin damage and improve skin texture which improves skin elasticity and suppleness. Its anti-inflammatory properties makes it an excellent agent for treating acne, sun-damaged, and or sensitive skin.

Furthermore, due to gold's natural light-reflecting color, gold nanoparticle can also create a brightening effect by making skin radiant and luminous. Over the course of the treatment, gold nanoparticle can make the skin appear smoother and even in color. A study in 2010 titled, "Novel Vitamin and Gold-Loaded Nanofiber Facial Mask for Topical Delivery" investigated how gold nanoparticle can be incorporated to facial mask along with Vitamin C (L-ascorbic acid), retinoic acid, and collagen using electrospinning. All of these properties and studies have suggested that gold nanoparticles can be beneficial when included in cream, lotion, or mask formulations for topical applications.
