= Phytosome =

Complex of a natural active ingredient and a phospholipid

A phytosome is a solid dispersion formed by a natural active ingredient and a phospholipid. The most common example of a phytosome is lecithin.

Phytosome formulations are claimed to enhance the bioabsorption of "conventional herbal extracts" or isolated active principles, both topically and orally.

Formulation with phospholipids has been applied to a number of popular herbal extracts and active molecules including Ginkgo biloba extract, bilobalide isolated from Ginkgo biloba, silybin isolated from milk thistle (Silybum marianum), curcumin isolated from turmeric, and green tea extract (Camellia sinensis).

An attempt to trademark the term in the USA failed on appeal. Legal analysis in the USA concluded, "Applicant's fatal error, according to the Board, was in using the term as the sole designation for its new product." At least one dictionary defined it as "a new term cosmetologists are using for the combination of liposomes ... and plant extracts."

Nevertheless, Phytosome is a proprietary technology and a registered trademark of Indena S.p.A.
