= Plasma electrochemistry =

Plasma electrochemistry is a new field of research where the interaction of plasma with an electrolyte solution is studied. It uses plasma to drive chemical reactions in liquid.
