= Nanoelectrochemistry =

Nanoelectrochemistry is a branch of electrochemistry that investigates the electrical and electrochemical properties of materials at the nanometer size regime. Nanoelectrochemistry plays significant role in the fabrication of various sensors, and devices for detecting molecules at very low concentrations. Two specializations of nanoelectrochemistry are nanopore-confined electrochemistry and nanopore electrochemistry.

== Mechanism ==
Two transport mechanisms are fundamental for nanoelectrochemistry: electron transfer and mass transport. The formulation of theoretical models allows to understand the role of the different species involved in the electrochemical reactions.

The electron transfer between the reactant and the nanoelectrode can be explained by the combination of various theories based on the Marcus theory.

Mass transport, that is the diffusion of the reactant molecules from the electrolyte bulk to the nanoelectrode, is influenced by the formation of a double electric layer at the electrode/electrolyte interface. At the nanoscale it is necessary to theorize a dynamic double electric layer which takes into account an overlap of the Stern layer and the diffuse layer.

Knowledge of the mechanisms involved allows to build computational models that combine the density functional theory with electron transfer theories and the dynamic double electric layer. In the field of molecular modelling, accurate models could predict the behaviour of the system as reactants, electrolyte or electrode change.

=== Interface effect ===
The role of the surface is strongly reaction-specific: in fact, one site can catalyze certain reactions and inhibit other ones.
According to TSK model, surface atoms in nanocrystals can occupy terrace, step or kink positions: each site has a different tendency to adsorb reactants and to let them move along the surface. Generally, sites having lower coordination number (steps and kinks) are more reactive due to their high free energy. High energy sites, however, are less thermodynamically stable and nanocrystals have a tendency to transform to their equilibrium shape.

Thanks to the progress in nanoparticles synthesis it is now possible to have a single-crystal approach to surface science, allowing more precise research on the effect of a given surface. Studies have been conducted on nanoelectrodes exposing a (100), (110) or (111) plane to a solution containing the reactants, in order to define the surface effect on reaction rate and selectivity of the most common electrochemical reactions.

== Nanoelectrodes ==
Nanoelectrodes are tiny electrodes made of metals or semiconducting materials having typical dimensions of 1-100 nm. Various forms of nanoelectrodes have been developed taking advantage of the different possible fabrication techniques: among the most studied are the nanoband, disk, hemispherical, nanopore geometries as well as the different forms of carbon nanostructures.

It is necessary to characterize each produced electrode: size and shape determine its behavior. The most used characterization techniques are:

- Electron microscopy
- Steady-state voltammetry
- Atomic force microscopy (AFM)
- scanning electrochemical microscopy (SECM)

There are mainly two properties that distinguish nanoelectrodes from electrodes: smaller RC constant and faster mass transfer. The former allows measurements to be made in high-resistance solutions because they offer less resistance, the latter, due to radial diffusion, allows much faster voltammetry responses. Due to these and other properties, nanoelectrodes are used in various applications:

- Studying the kinetics of fast reactions
- Electrochemical reactions
- Studying small volumes, such as cells or single molecules
- As probes for obtaining high-resolution images with scanning electrochemical microscopy (SECM)

== Nanoelectrode arrays ==
The main advantages of using nanoelectrodes and arrays of nanoelectrodes include enhanced mass transport, lower capacitance, ability to work in smaller volumes and smaller overall device footprints.

The electrical current generated at an electrode is proportional to the electrode's geometric area. A disadvantage of using a single nanoelectrode is that it generates a small current output, which puts pressure on the instrumentation, and in turn, the reliability of the measurements recorded. One way to overcome this is the use an array of nanoelectrodes. The arrays produce a current, which is proportional with the number of electrodes in the array. This method has been used extensively in electroanalysis. Through the careful and accurate fabrication of arrays of nanoelectrodes, the electrochemical instrumentation is more reliable for sensitive measurement that enables implementation of a range of electroanalytical techniques.

There are two main types of arrangements; nanoelectrode arrays (NEAs) where the nanoelectrodes are spaced in an ordered arrangement and nanoelectrode ensembles (NEEs), where the individual nanoelectrodes are distributed randomly.
